= South Greenford railway station =

Railway station in England

South Greenford
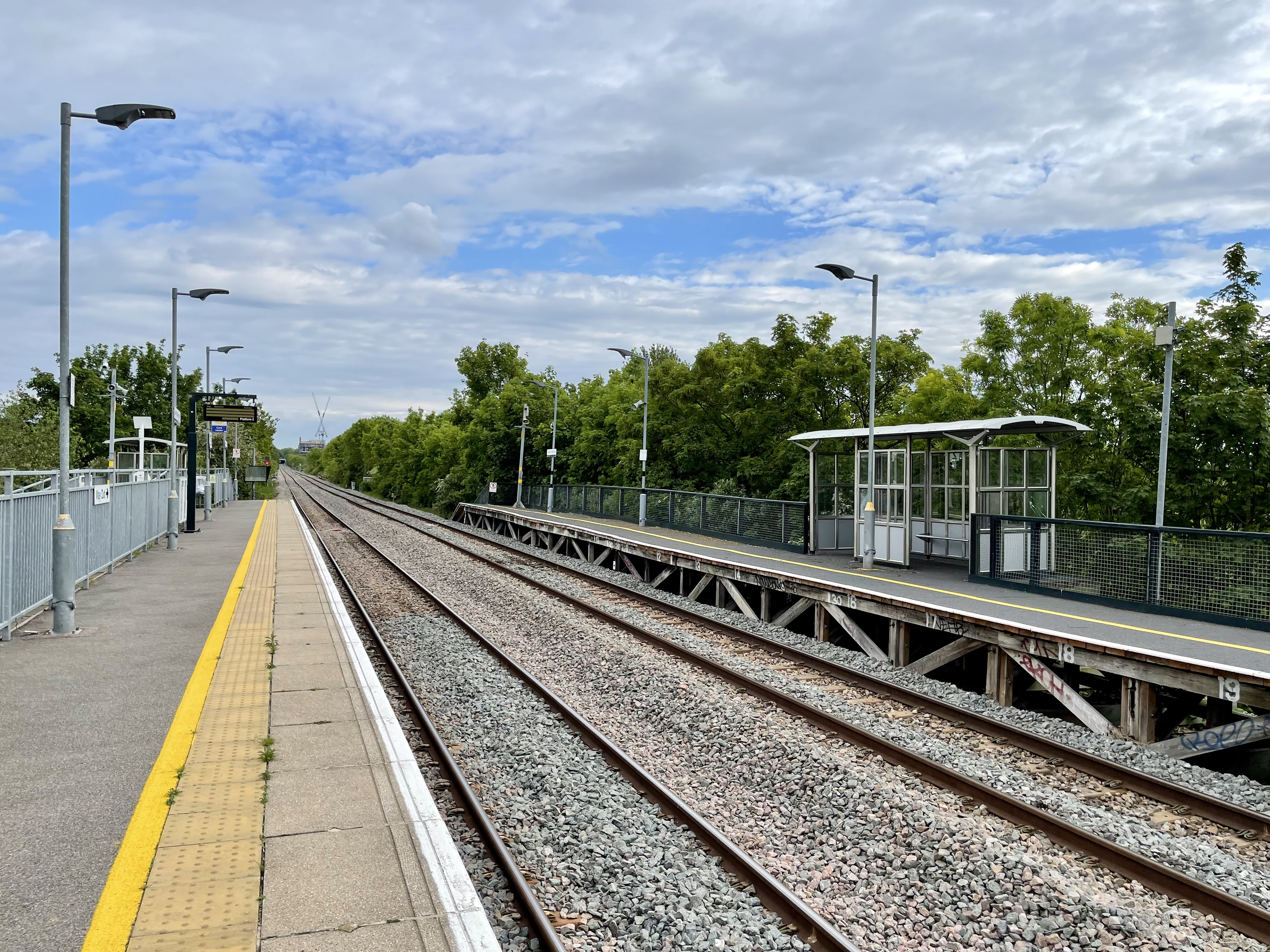
- Interactive map of South Greenford

General information
- Location: Greenford
- Local authority: London Borough of Ealing
- Managed by: Great Western Railway
- Station code: SGN
- DfT category: F2
- Number of platforms: 2
- Fare zone: 4

National Rail annual entry and exit
- 2021–22: ▲13,462
- 2022–23: ▲20,706
- 2023–24: ▲38,330
- 2024–25: ▲52,212
- 2025–26: ▲52,984

Key dates
- 20 September 1926: Station opened as South Greenford Halt
- 5 May 1969: Renamed South Greenford

Other information
- External links: Departures; Facilities
- Coordinates: 51.5342°N 0.3369°W

South Greenford railway station is in the London Borough of Ealing in west London, and is on the Greenford branch in London fare zone 4. It is 1 mile 58 chains (2.8 km) down the line from West Ealing and 8 miles 24 chains (13.4 km) measured from London Paddington. All trains serving South Greenford are operated by Great Western Railway.

The station is located on the A40, south of Greenford Green, north-east of Greenford Broadway, and just west of Perivale.

== History ==
The Greenford branch of the Great Western Railway (GWR) had been used for regular passenger services since 1904, but the halt at South Greenford did not open until 20 September 1926.

The station's platforms were taken from Trumpers Crossing Halte railway station when it closed six months prior.

Originally named South Greenford Halt, the suffix was dropped on 5 May 1969.

At present, signage on the station carries, in smaller font, an alternative name for the station. The alternative name is "West Perivale".

== Services ==
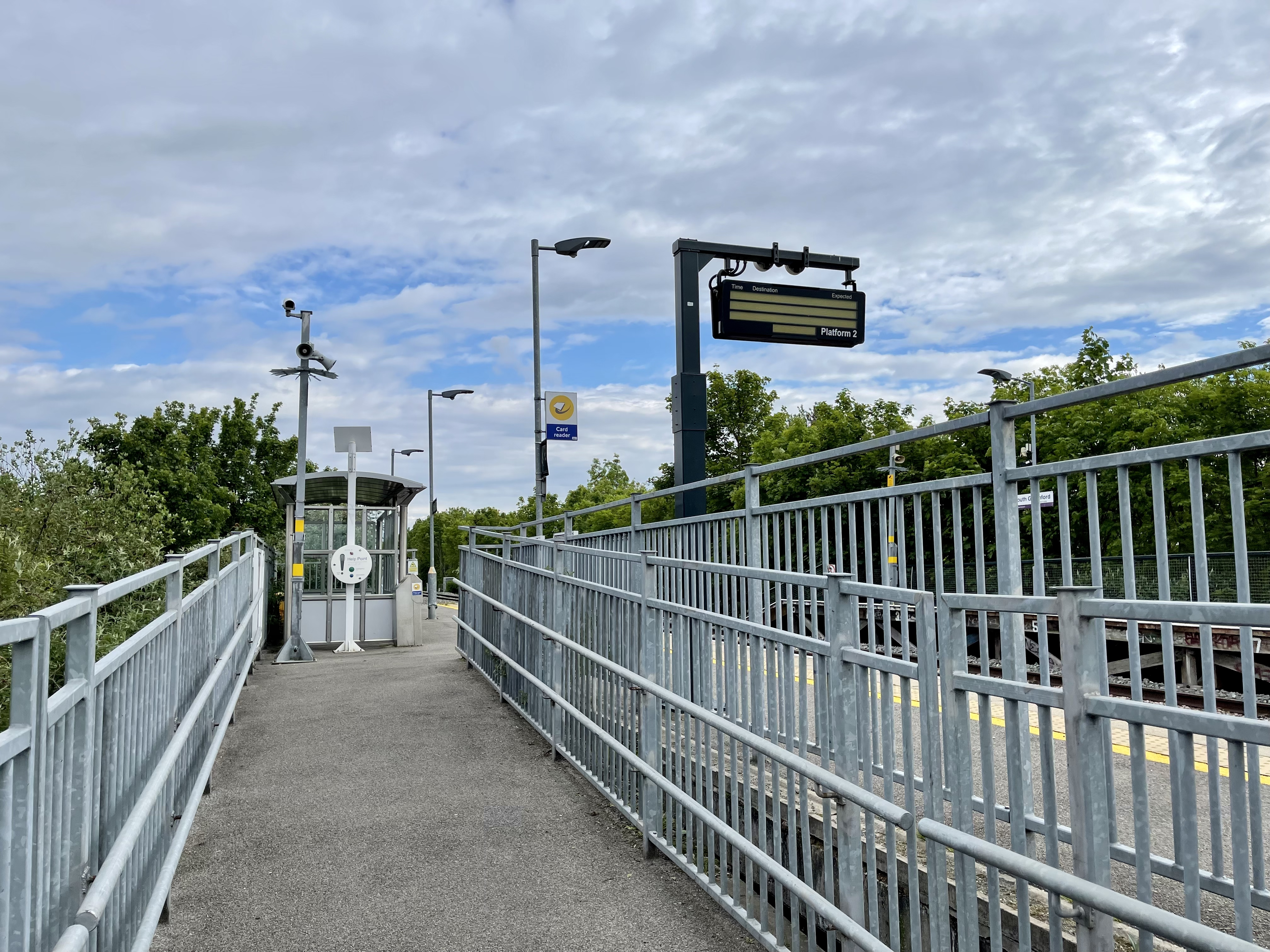
Ramp to the southbound platform 2 at South Greenford

The normal service from the station runs every day except Sunday until about 22:00 with two trains per hour towards Greenford, where there is a connection with the Central line, and two trains per hour to West Ealing, from where Elizabeth line services run eastbound to London Paddington, Abbey Wood and Shenfield and westbound to Heathrow Airport. The station is unstaffed. Contactless payment or Oyster cards can be used for journeys. The service uses Class 165 and 230 multiple units.

As well as the passenger trains serving South Greenford, the Greenford branch also carries freight traffic, mainly waste and aggregates as well as some empty passenger stock movements.

Preceding station	National Rail	Following station
Greenford	Great Western Railway Greenford branch line Monday-Saturday only	Castle Bar Park

== Connections ==
London Buses route 95 serves the station.
