= Castle Bar Park railway station =

National Rail station in London, England

Castle Bar Park
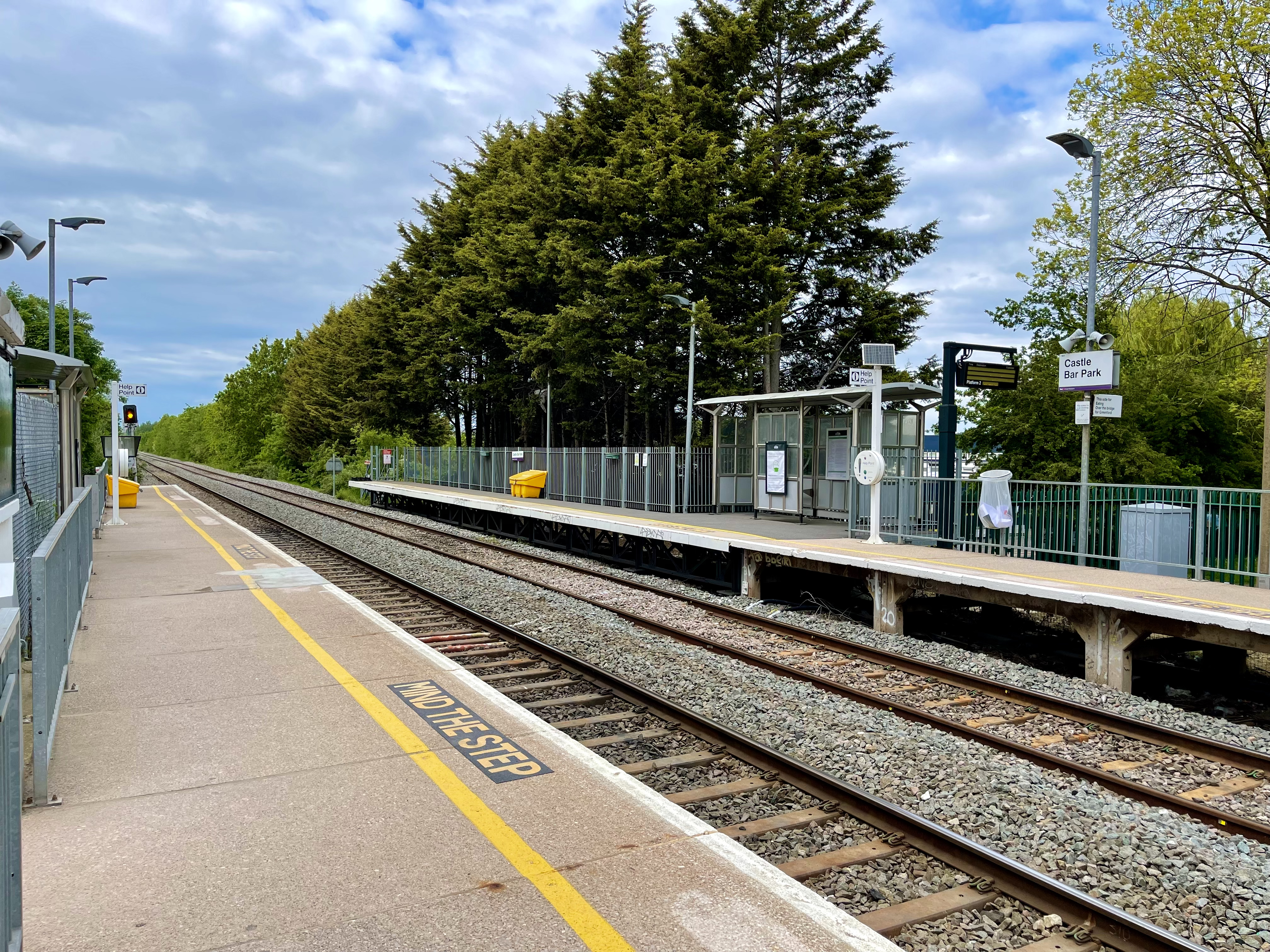
- Interactive map of Castle Bar Park

General information
- Location: West Ealing
- Local authority: London Borough of Ealing
- Managed by: Great Western Railway
- Station code: CBP
- DfT category: E
- Number of platforms: 2
- Accessible: Yes (partial, platform 1)
- Fare zone: 4

National Rail annual entry and exit
- 2020–21: ▼26,778
- 2021–22: ▲41,128
- 2022–23: ▲66,670
- 2023–24: ▲101,564
- 2024–25: ▲112,884

Key dates
- 1 May 1904: Opened

Other information
- External links: Departures; Facilities
- Coordinates: 51.522820°N 0.331467°W

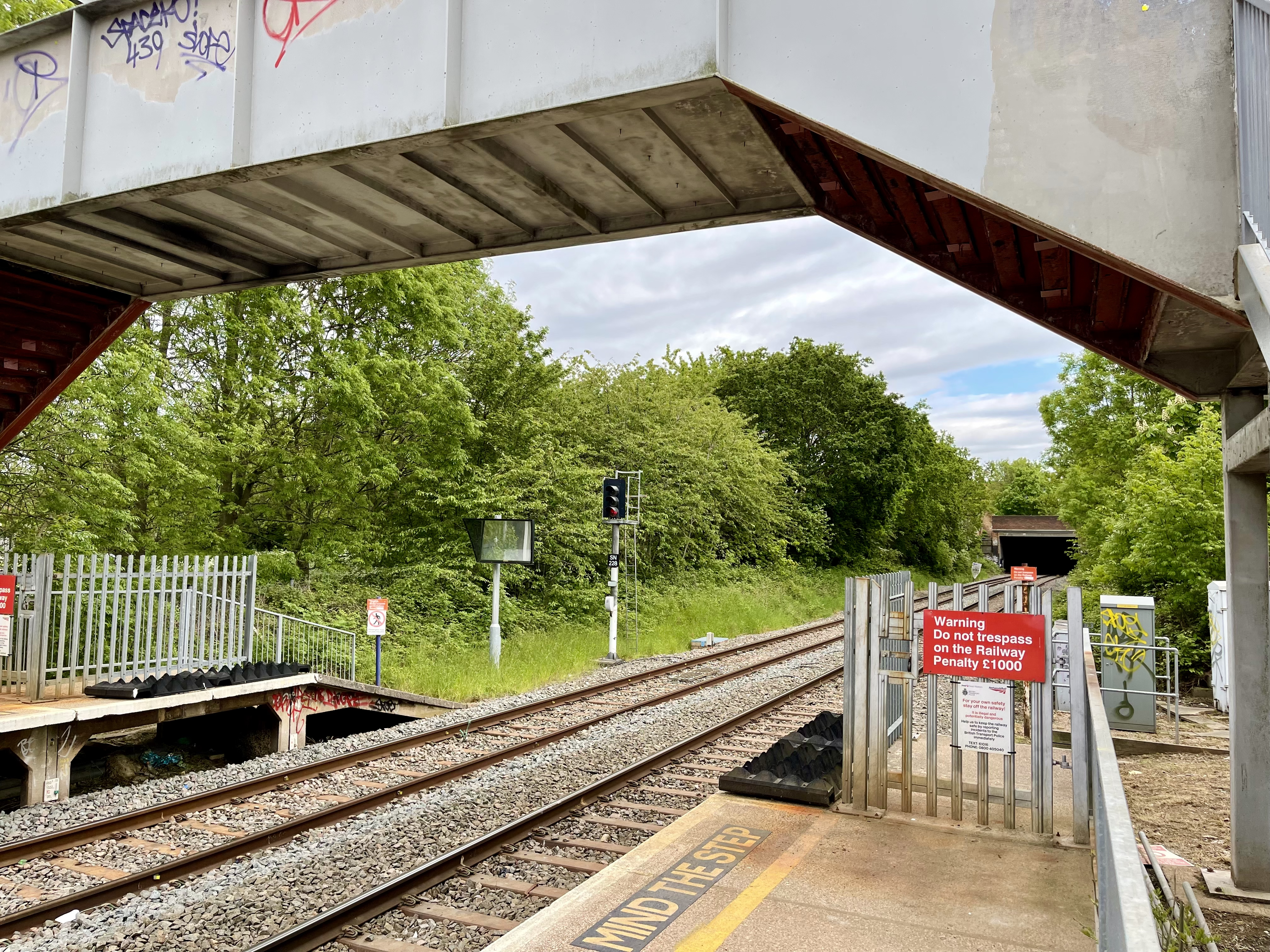
View southward, towards West Ealing

Castle Bar Park railway station is in the London Borough of Ealing in west London, England and is in London fare zone 4. It is on the Greenford branch line, 78 chains (1.6 km) down the line from West Ealing and 7 miles 44 chains (12.2 km) measured from London Paddington.

The station and all trains serving it are operated by Great Western Railway. When opened in 1904, it was called Castle Bar Park Halt. The suffix 'Halt' was dropped on 5 May 1969.

The ticket office opens only morning peak hours from Monday to Friday; ticket machines were removed in 2005 due to persistent vandalism. New aluminium and perspex passenger shelters and a replacement "help point" machine were added in 2006. There is also a footbridge linking the platforms so step free access is limited to the Greenford bound platform only.

As of October 2008, Oyster "pay as you go" can be used for journeys originating or ending at Castle Bar Park.

== Service ==
All services at Castle Bar Park are operated by Great Western Railway using Class 165 DMUs or Class 230 BEMUs.

The station is served by two trains per hour between Greenford and West Ealing on weekdays and Saturdays only. The first train of the day towards Greenford and the last train of the day from Greenford are extended to start and finish at London Paddington.

There is no Sunday service at the station.

Preceding station	National Rail	Following station
South Greenford	Great Western Railway Greenford branch line Monday-Saturday only	Drayton Green

== Connections ==
London Buses route E11 serves the station.
