= West Ealing =

District in West London, England

Coordinates: 51.51898°N 0.31498°W

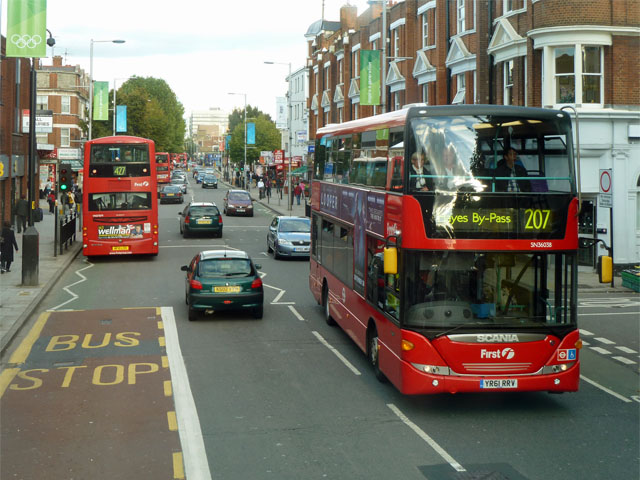
- Two buses in the Broadway, West Ealing

- Location within Greater London
- OS grid reference: TQ153802
- London borough: Ealing
- Ceremonial county: Greater London
- Region: London
- Country: England
- Sovereign state: United Kingdom
- Post town: LONDON
- Postcode district: W13
- Dialling code: 020
- Police: Metropolitan
- Fire: London
- Ambulance: London
- UK Parliament: Ealing Central and Acton; Ealing Southall
- London Assembly: Ealing and Hillingdon

West Ealing is a district in the London Borough of Ealing, in West London. Its centre is about three-quarters of a mile (1.2 km) west of Ealing Broadway, along the Uxbridge Road. It is also bordered by Hanwell to the west, Perivale to the north and Northfields to the south, and falls under the postcode district W13. West Ealing station is on the Elizabeth line and Greenford branch line.

== History ==
=== Early history ===
A hamlet named West Ealing was recorded in 1234 AD, although it was later renamed Ealing Dean; the West Ealing railway station was known as the Castle Hill & Ealing Dean Station when it was built in 1871. Ealing Dean may derive from denu (valley); its first reference was in 1456, and it appears on a 1777 Ealing parish map. Most of what is now West Ealing was open countryside, with houses at Ealing Dean, Drayton Green and Castle Bear Hill (now Castlebar Hill).

In 1387 Drayton Green was known as Drayton and, later, as Drayton in Ealing. During the late 19th century, Drayton was a hamlet with eight householders. The area around Drayton Green Lane was later called Steven's Town and had over forty cottages.

A major east–west road in the area became known as the Uxbridge Road. It was a popular 19th-century stagecoach route, and the London-to-Banbury-and-Oxford coach stopped at the Halfway House pub (the present Broadwalk Hotel) in West Ealing. The Green Man pub in West Ealing was a carters' stop, reportedly with stabling for a hundred horses.

=== 19th century ===
During the 19th century much of the land from the Uxbridge Road south to Windmill Road, east to Northfield Avenue and west to Boston Road was market gardens and orchards. In addition to a few streets named for apple varieties, among the last remaining evidence of this is the little-changed Steel's Fruit Packing Warehouse at the intersection of Northfield and Northcroft Roads.

At the eastern boundary of these market gardens and orchards were allotments dating to 1832, when the area known as Ealing Dean Common (both sides of Northfield Avenue) was given to West Ealing's poor by the bishop of London. The allotments on the east side of Northfield Avenue are original, but those on the west side were developed in the early 1980s.

Ealing Dean's principal claim to fame in the 1800s was its pony and donkey races. These races, on what was known as Jackass Common (the present Dean Gardens), ended in 1880 when the local council forbade them on moral grounds.

In 1882, the Ealing Lawn Tennis Club was founded on land between St. Leonards Road and the Great Western Railway (GWR). The club quickly became the most successful women's lawn-tennis club in the world. Three Ealing-born club members (Blanche Bingley, Charlotte Cooper and Dorothea Douglass) won a total of thirteen Wimbledon Singles titles between 1886 and 1906. In 1906, the club moved to Creffield Road in Ealing Common.

During the 1890s, central West Ealing's shops were more informal than those in central Ealing. There were then (and now) fruit and vegetable stalls in West Ealing which were absent from Ealing. Central West Ealing throve during the mid-20th century when draper, house furnisher, clothier and outfitters F. H. Rowse and draper and fashion house W. J. Daniel and Company flourished with Marks and Spencer, British Home Stores, Woolworths, Sainsbury's and WHSmith. Later, Waitrose, McDonald's and Blockbuster Video arrived.

The West Ealing Library is on Melbourne Avenue south of the Uxbridge Road. Its former location, which opened in 1903, was between Melbourne Avenue and St James's Avenue (the present Sainsbury's location).

=== Modern history ===
West Ealing had a large cinema at the Uxbridge Road end of Northfield Avenue, which opened as the Kinema in 1913 and replaced the Ealing Dean Cottage Hospital. The cinema was rebuilt in 1928 as the Lido. When attendance fell, it was divided into two small cinemas (Studio one and Studio two) and the main hall became a bingo hall. After a change in ownership, the cinemas became Cannon 1 and 2 and the bingo facility reopened as a snooker hall. With another change of ownership it was briefly the Gosai, an Indian cinema primarily devoted to Bollywood films. After it closed, it was demolished in 2005. The site has been redeveloped in a partnership of the Dominion Housing Group and the Ealing Community and Voluntary Service; the new building, the Lido Centre, opened in 2007 as Ealing's volunteer centre. Above the voluntary-organisation work space are a number of small utility flats intended for social housing.

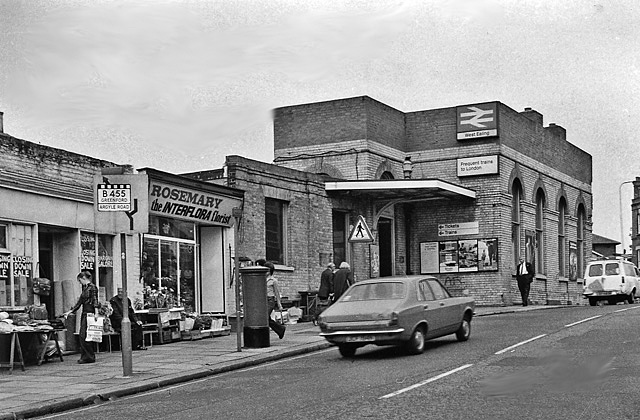
West Ealing station in 1978

Residential building growth in the area may be attributed to the 1871 GWR railway station at Ealing Dean and the line's later extension to Greenford via Castle Bar Park railway station and Drayton Green railway station; the 1901 London United Tramways Company line from Ealing to Southall, and the 1907 District Railway halt at Northfields.

During the 1920s, a number of houses were built on the Argyle Park estate (from the Argyle Road to the Greenford GWR railway line) and along Kent Avenue. Later housing developments replaced the allotments west of Northfield Avenue; others created flats in Langham Gardens (off Gordon Road) in 1970 and another, in 1977, created the Green Man Lane Estate. In the early 1980s, the Berners Drive-Coleridge Square estate was built next to the rebuilt West Middlesex Lawn Tennis club west of Drayton Green.

Since World War II there has been rebuilding in West Ealing, with a number of Victorian houses converted into flats. F. H. Rowse's, WHSmith, Marks and Spencer, Woolworths and McDonald's have left. Recent arrivals include Wilko. The Daniel's store has been replaced by a gym under a block of flats. Waitrose replaced its original store with a larger one. Although West Ealing's shopping and cultural facilities have gradually declined, in 2001 it saw the establishment of London's only street market dedicated to farm produce.

There has been a large settling of immigrants from countries such as Somalia and Poland to name a few. This has led to the creation of multiple estates and housing projects to house these new resident influx into the area. One estate in particular is the Green Man Lane Estate, which was built in the 70's and is situated just north of the High Street. This estate has been knocked down and still is in the process of a regeneration which is to make way for replacement properties for affordable rent, shared ownership and outright sale.

Since 1999, West Ealing has been the home of Ealing Trailfinders, a professional rugby union club currently in the second division.

== Religion ==
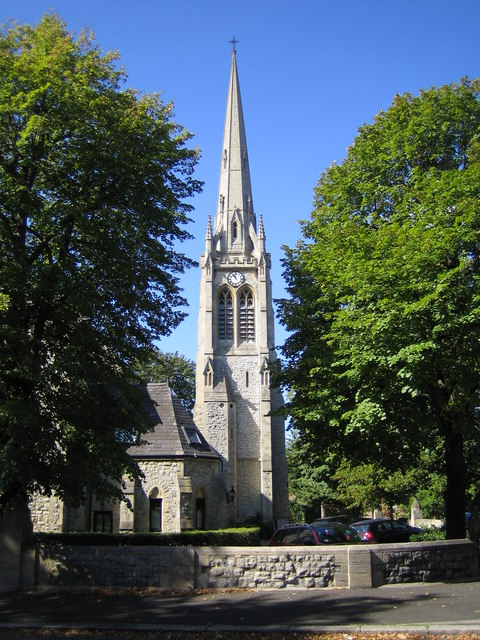
The old St Stephen's Church, West Ealing (now used as flats)

There are three Church of England churches in West Ealing. St John's Church is in Mattock Lane, to the southeast; St James's Church is located to the southwest, in St James's Avenue; and St Stephen's Church is located to the north, in St Stephen's Road.

St John's Church was built in 1876 by Edwin Henry Horne, burned down in 1920, and was rebuilt and re-opened in 1923. St James's Church was founded in 1900, disused later in the 20th century and "re-planted" with a new congregation in the late 1980s; St James' closed again in 2018 and was consecrated as the Assyrian St Mary's Cathedral, London in 2025. St Stephen's Church was founded in 1867 and in 1891 a spire, nearly fifty metres tall, was added which today still dominates the Ealing skyline. The old church building suffered from subsidence and by 1979 the building had to be closed and Sunday services held elsewhere. In 1985, the decision was made to sell the church building to a developer for conversion into apartments and build a new church centre on the site of the old Church Hall. This was completed and dedicated in 1987.

West Ealing is also home to the West London Islamic Centre (WLIC). The West London Islamic Centre was established in 1984 to serve the needs of the then fledgling Muslim community of Ealing and Hanwell. The original Mosque based at 119 and 121 Oaklands Road consisted of two shops that had been converted to accommodate men and women. This mosque is currently under construction and will likely be completed in Mid-Late 2019 and become one of the largest mosques in London.

There are also two Hindu temples housed in former church buildings, and West Ealing is also the location of Ealing Liberal Synagogue.

== Political representation ==
West Ealing is made up of three electoral wards for local council elections: Cleveland, Elthorne and Walpole; it is also served by small portions of the Northfields and Ealing Broadway wards. These wards each elect three councillors to the Ealing Council. Recent elections have seen seats changing parties; as of the 2014 election the area has mainly Labour representation, with Labour councillors in Elthorne and Walpole and two Labour and one Conservative councillor in Cleveland.

West Ealing was in the parliamentary constituency of Ealing Central and Acton (represented since 2015 by Labour MP Rupa Huq). Following boundary changes for the 2024 general election, it became part of Ealing Southall (represented by Labour MP Deirdre Costigan). Portions of the area are in the Ealing North constituency, represented by Labour MP James Murray. West Ealing is in the London Assembly constituency of Ealing and Hillingdon, which has one assembly member: Onkar Sahota (Labour), who was elected in May 2012.

== Geography ==
Although there are no official boundaries for West Ealing, with the exception of Grosvenor Road in W7 it falls into the postcode district W13. W13 reaches as north as Perivale and as south as Northfields. 6 bus routes (E3, E8, 207, 427, 483, 607) run through West Ealing and link the district to Shepherd's Bush, Ealing, Hanwell, Greenford, Acton, Southall

=== Neighbouring locations ===
- Perivale
- Hanwell
- Ealing
- Brentford
- Chiswick
- Northfields
- Greenford

== Rail stations ==
- West Ealing Station (Elizabeth line and Great Western Railway)
- Castle Bar Station
- Drayton Green Station

=== Nearby tube and rail stations ===
- Boston Manor tube station
- Ealing Broadway station (tube and mainline rail)
- Hanwell station
- Northfields tube station
- Perivale tube station
- South Ealing station

== Sources ==
- Hounsell, Peter (1991) Ealing and Hanwell Past, London : Historical Publ., ISBN 0-948667-13-3
- Neaves, Cyril M. (1971 [1931]) A history of Greater Ealing, Local history reprint series, 2nd Ed, Wakefield : S.R. Publishers [Facsimile reprint of 2nd ed., Brentford: Brentford Printing], ISBN 0-85409-679-5
