= Greenford station =

London Underground & National Rail station

Greenford
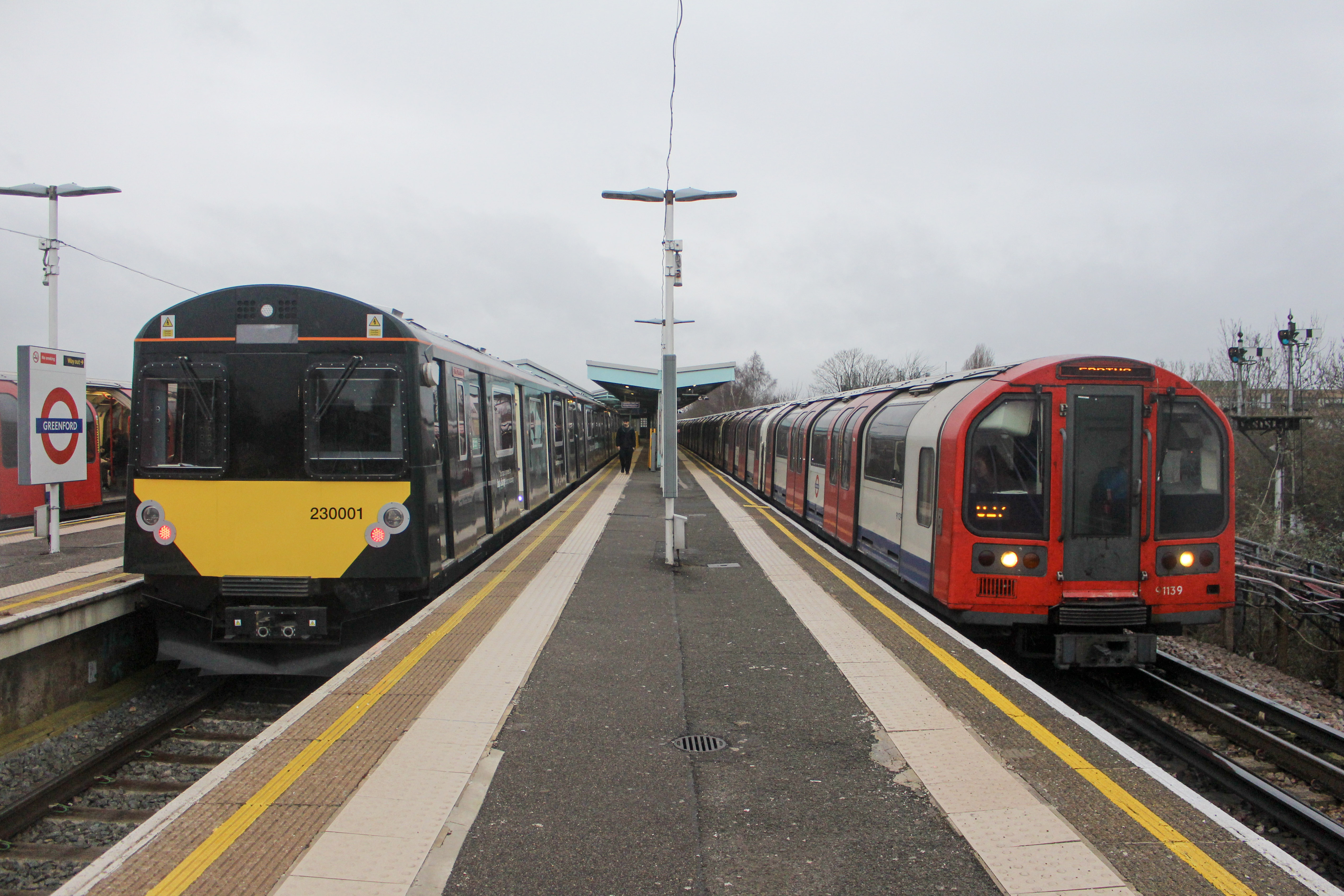
- GWR Class 230 and Central line 1992 Stock at the station platform in February 2026
- Interactive map of Greenford

General information
- Location: Greenford
- Local authority: London Borough of Ealing
- Managed by: London Underground
- Owner: Transport for London
- Station code: GFD
- Number of platforms: 3 (2 LU, 1 bay); 1 bay platform face disused
- Fare zone: 4

London Underground annual entry and exit
- 2020: ▼2.96 million
- 2021: ▼2.05 million
- 2022: ▲3.29 million
- 2023: ▼3.27 million
- 2024: 3.27 million

National Rail annual entry and exit
- 2020–21: ▼58,834
- 2021–22: ▲0.100 million
- 2022–23: ▲0.126 million
- 2023–24: ▼0.123 million
- 2024–25: ▲0.140 million

Key dates
- 1 October 1904: Opened
- 30 June 1947: London Underground station opened
- 17 June 1963: Original main line platforms closed

Other information
- External links: TfL station info page; Departures; Facilities
- Coordinates: 51.5426°N 0.3463°W

Greenford is a London Underground and National Rail station in Greenford, Greater London, and is owned and managed by London Underground. It is the terminus of the National Rail Greenford branch line, 2 miles 40 chains (2.5 mi; 4.0 km) down the line from West Ealing and 9 miles 6 chains (9.1 mi; 14.6 km) measured from London Paddington. On the Central line, it is between Perivale and Northolt stations while on National Rail, the next station to the south on the branch is South Greenford.

Greenford station is in London fare zone 4.

== History ==
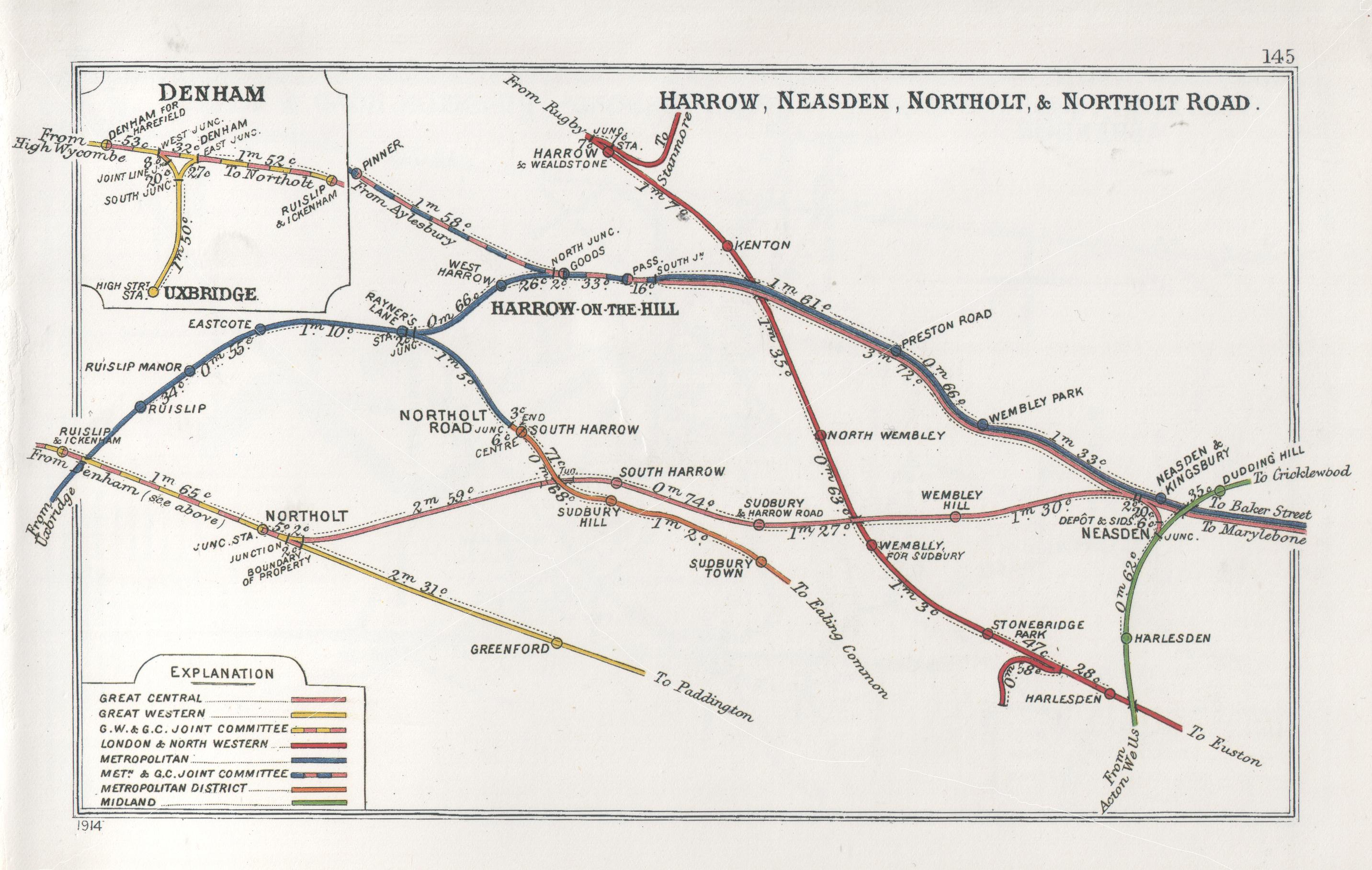
A 1914 Railway Clearing House map of railways in the vicinity of Greenford

The original Greenford station was opened by the Great Western Railway on 1 October 1904 on the joint "New North Main Line" (present-day Acton–Northolt line).

The present station, adjacent to the original, was designed by Brian Lewis and built in the Central line extension of the 1935-40 New Works Programme of the London Passenger Transport Board. It was completed by Frederick Francis Charles Curtis and opened on 30 June 1947 after delay due to World War II. Service at the original ("main-line") station was gradually reduced and it was closed in 1963. Operational responsibility for the station transferred from British Rail to London Transport with effect from 13 November 1967.

The site of the old station for the New North Main Line can still be seen from inside Central line trains.

== The station today ==
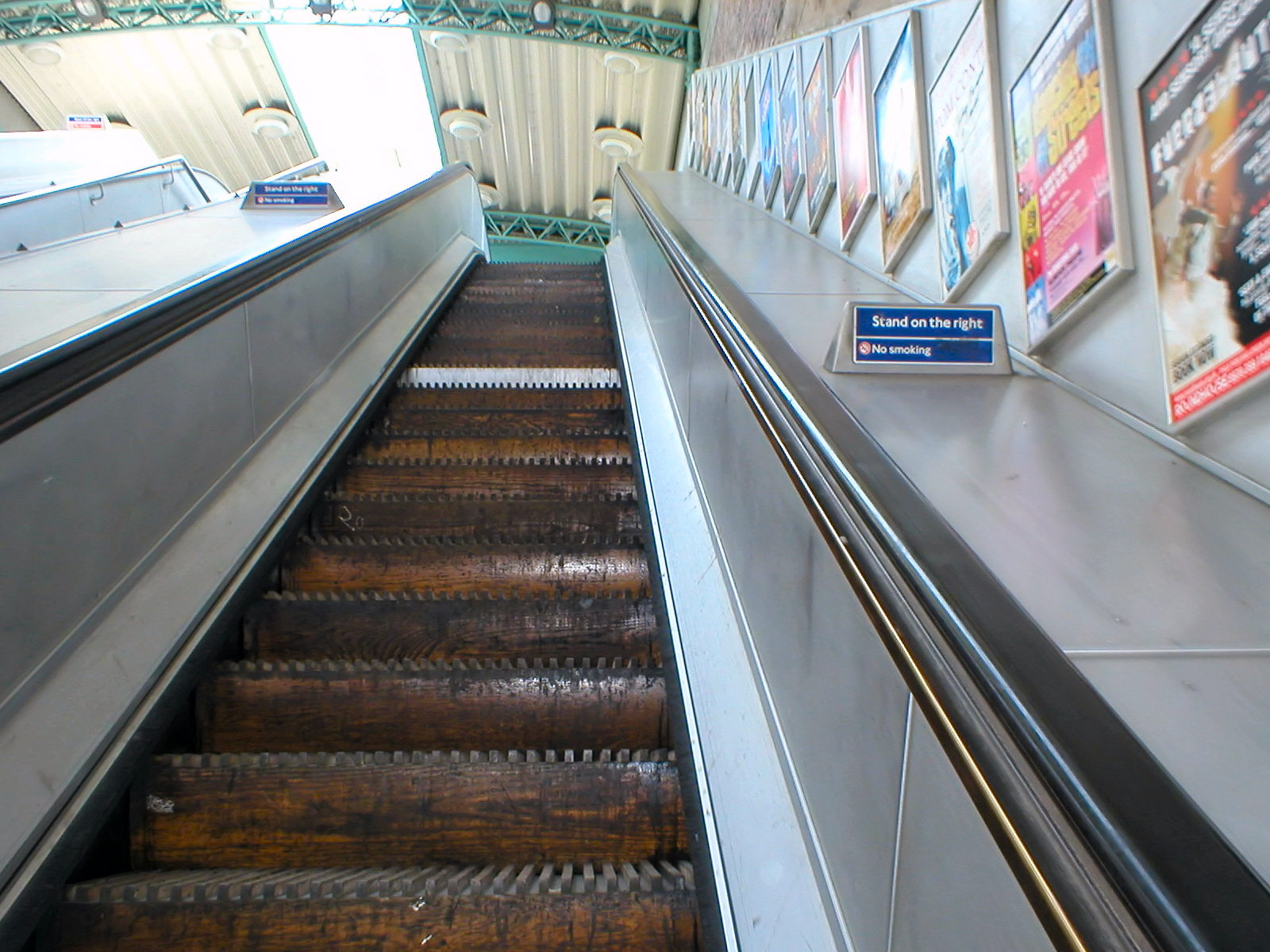
The remaining wooden escalators at Greenford in June 2006, removed in 2014 and replaced with an inclinator. The wooden escalator leading up to the platforms, was the last of its kind in use on the London Underground.

Greenford station is above ground level with an island platform for the Central line. A bay platform facing south-east between the Underground platforms serves the Greenford branch service operated by Great Western Railway. The branch line then continues south and joins the Great Western Main Line at West Ealing.

Platform 1 is for westbound Central line trains, and platform 3 for eastbound trains. The access to the platform via escalators takes passengers to the front of the train for westbound service, and the rear for eastbound service.

Greenford was the first London Underground station to have an escalator up to platforms above street level. Until 2014 it remained the final London Underground station with a wooden-treaded escalator in service; all other such escalators were previously converted to fully metal treads, or removed altogether from sub-surface Underground stations in the wake of the fatal 1987 King's Cross fire.

In addition to the shuttle train, the line between Greenford and West Ealing carries freight services including containerised domestic waste from near Brentford, sand and gravel traffic and previously saw the occasional special passenger service and a daily Chiltern Railways "parliamentary ghost train" from West Ruislip to West Ealing that returned non-stop to High Wycombe.

In 2009, because of financial constraints, TfL decided to stop work on a project to provide step-free access at Greenford and five other stations, on the grounds that these were relatively quiet stations and some were already one or two stops away from an existing step-free station. £3.9 million was spent on Greenford before the project was halted. The step-free access project, consisting of a glass incline lift, was later restarted, opening on 20 October 2015.

== Services ==
=== London Underground ===
The typical off-peak service on the Central line in trains per hour (tph) is:

- 9 tph westbound to West Ruislip
- 3 tph westbound to Northolt
- 9 tph eastbound to Epping
- 3 tph eastbound to Loughton

=== National Rail ===
Great Western Railway operates a shuttle service to West Ealing around every 30 minutes except on Sundays. Services call at South Greenford, Castle Bar Park, Drayton Green and West Ealing and the journey time is just over 10 minutes. The final service of the day runs through to London Paddington, as well as the first terminating service. Until January 2017, all services used to run to and from London Paddington, however, after the construction of a new bay platform at West Ealing and the introduction of Elizabeth line services from London Paddington to Reading, it was then reduced to a shuttle running to and from West Ealing. The services use either Class 165 or 230 multiple units.

Preceding station	London Underground	Following station
Northolt towards West Ruislip	Central line West Ruislip branch	Perivale towards Epping, Hainault or Woodford via Newbury Park
Preceding station	National Rail	Following station
Terminus	Great Western Railway Greenford branch line Monday–Saturday only	South Greenford
Disused railways
Northolt	Great Western Railway; New North Main Line	Perivale Halt

== Connections ==
London Buses routes 92, 105, 395 and E6 serve the station.
