= Drayton Green railway station =

National Rail station in London, England

Drayton Green
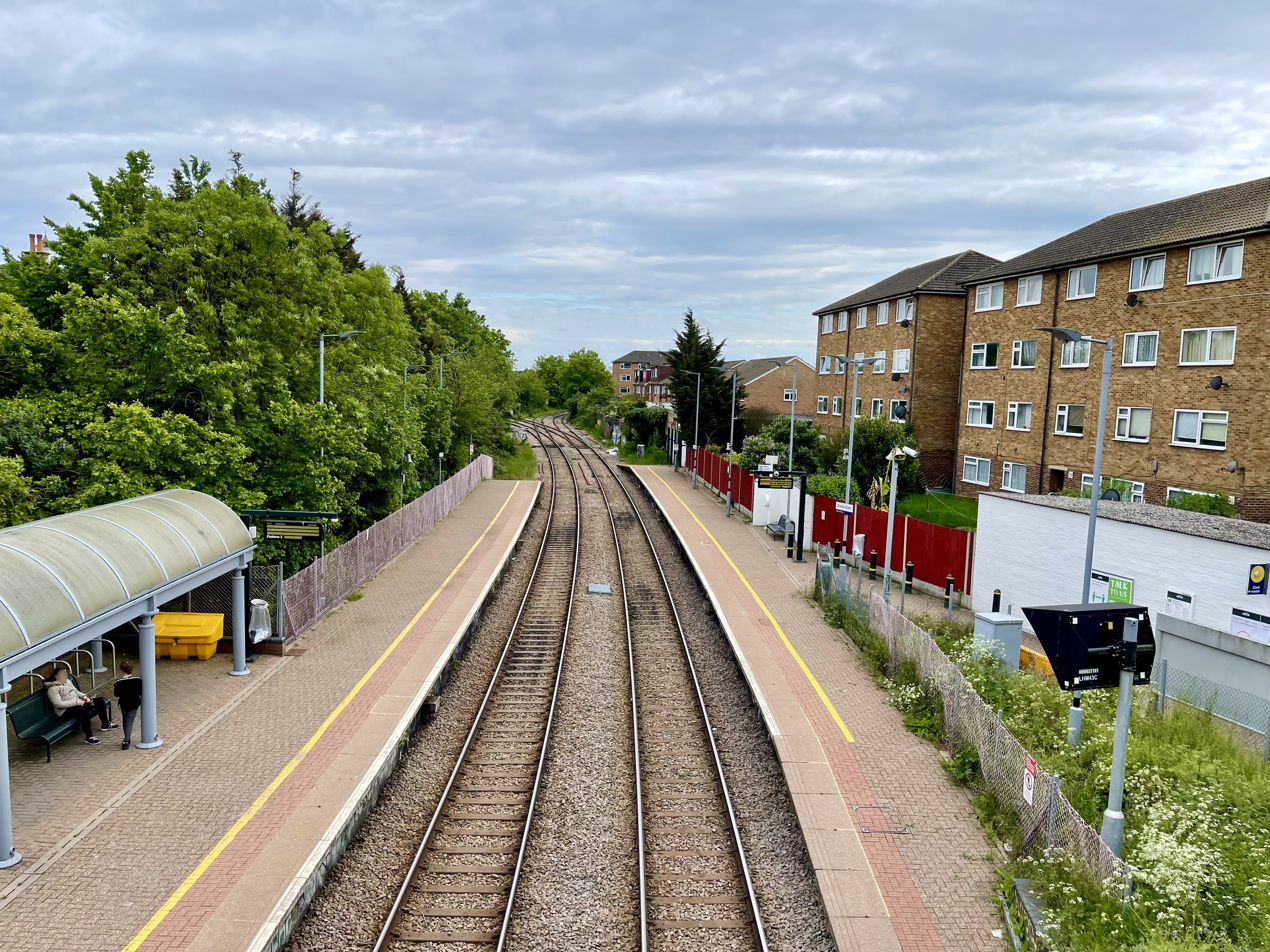
- Interactive map of Drayton Green

General information
- Location: West Ealing
- Local authority: London Borough of Ealing
- Managed by: Great Western Railway
- Station code: DRG
- DfT category: F2
- Number of platforms: 2
- Fare zone: 4

National Rail annual entry and exit
- 2021–22: ▲10,846
- 2022–23: ▲16,082
- 2023–24: ▲20,198
- 2024–25: ▲23,270
- 2025–26: ▼20,738

Key dates
- 1 March 1905: opened

Other information
- External links: Departures; Facilities
- Coordinates: 51.5165°N 0.33°W

Drayton Green railway station is in the London Borough of Ealing in west London, and is in London fare zone 4. It is on the Greenford branch line 41 chains (0.82 km) north of West Ealing where it joins the Great Western Main Line at 7 miles 7 chains (11.4 km) from London Paddington.

It was the least used station in Greater London from 2021/22 to 2022/23 according to the station usage estimates published by the Office of Rail and Road.

== History ==
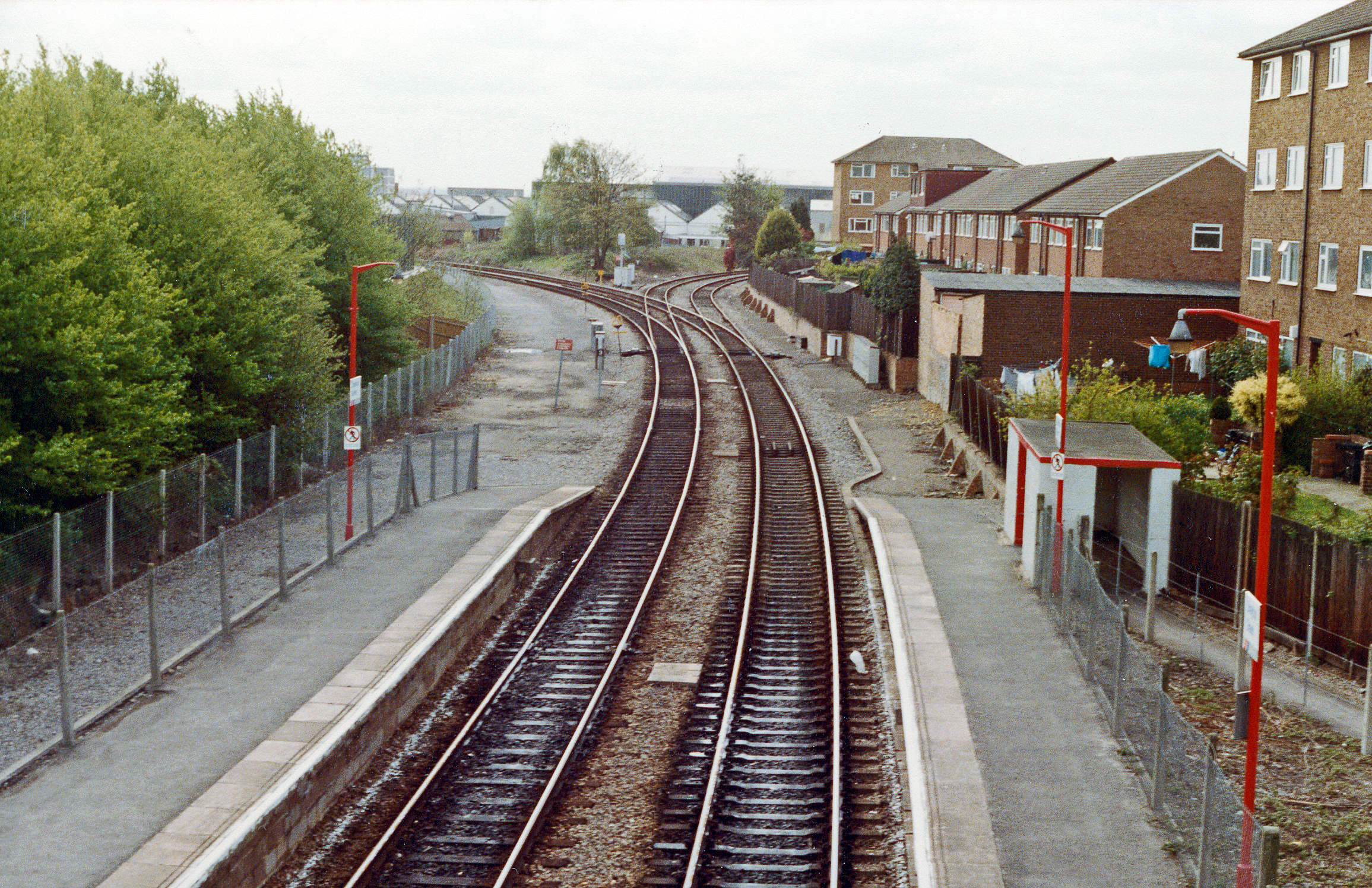
The station in 1990

It first opened as Drayton Green Halt, named after a nearby park and open space called Drayton Green.

Since 2008, no ticket machines have been available at the station, travelling is only possible using contactless payment cards, such as those of most UK banks or the Oyster card, or using pre-paid tickets and passes.

== Service ==
The station is served by Class 165 and 230 multiple units, with two trains per hour between Greenford and West Ealing on weekdays and Saturdays only. The first train of the day towards Greenford and the last train of the day from Greenford are extended to start and finish at London Paddington.

There is no Sunday service at the station.

| Preceding station | National Rail | Following station |
|---|---|---|
| Castle Bar Park | Great Western Railway Greenford branch line Monday-Saturday only | West Ealing |

== Connections ==
London Buses routes E1 and E11 serve the station.
