= Greenford branch line =

Railway line in London, England

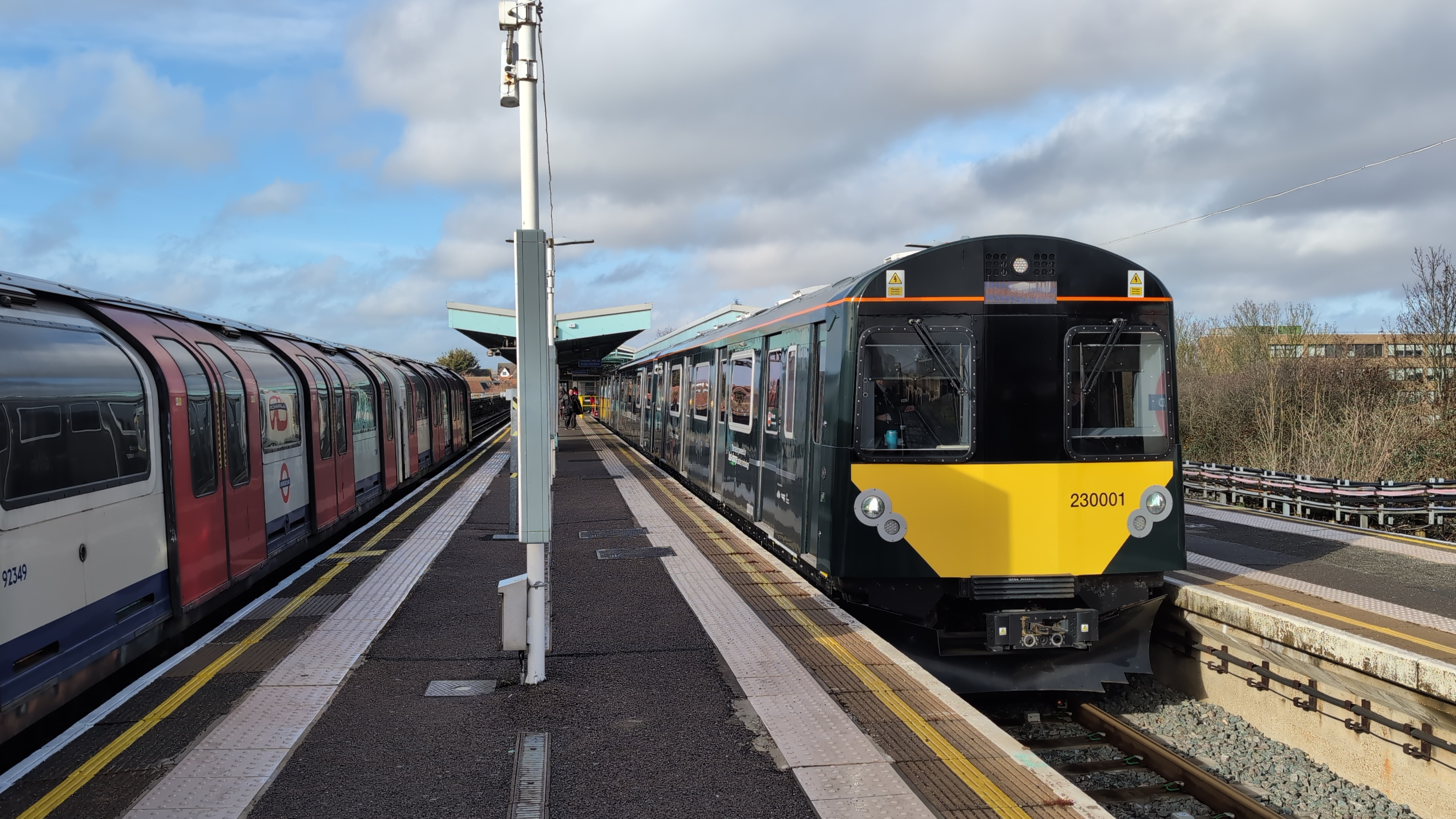
- A GWR Class 230 for West Ealing at Greenford.

Overview
- Status: Operational
- Owner: Network Rail
- Locale: Greater London
- Termini: Greenford; West Ealing
- Stations: 5

Service
- Type: Suburban rail
- System: National Rail
- Services: 1
- Operator(s): Great Western Railway; Chiltern Railways
- Depot(s): Reading TMD
- Rolling stock: Class 165 "Turbo"; Class 230 "D-Train" (Saturdays)

History
- Opened: 1903

Technical
- Track length: 2 miles 40 chains (4.0 km)
- Number of tracks: 2
- Track gauge: 4 ft 8 1/2 in (1,435 mm) standard gauge
Route map
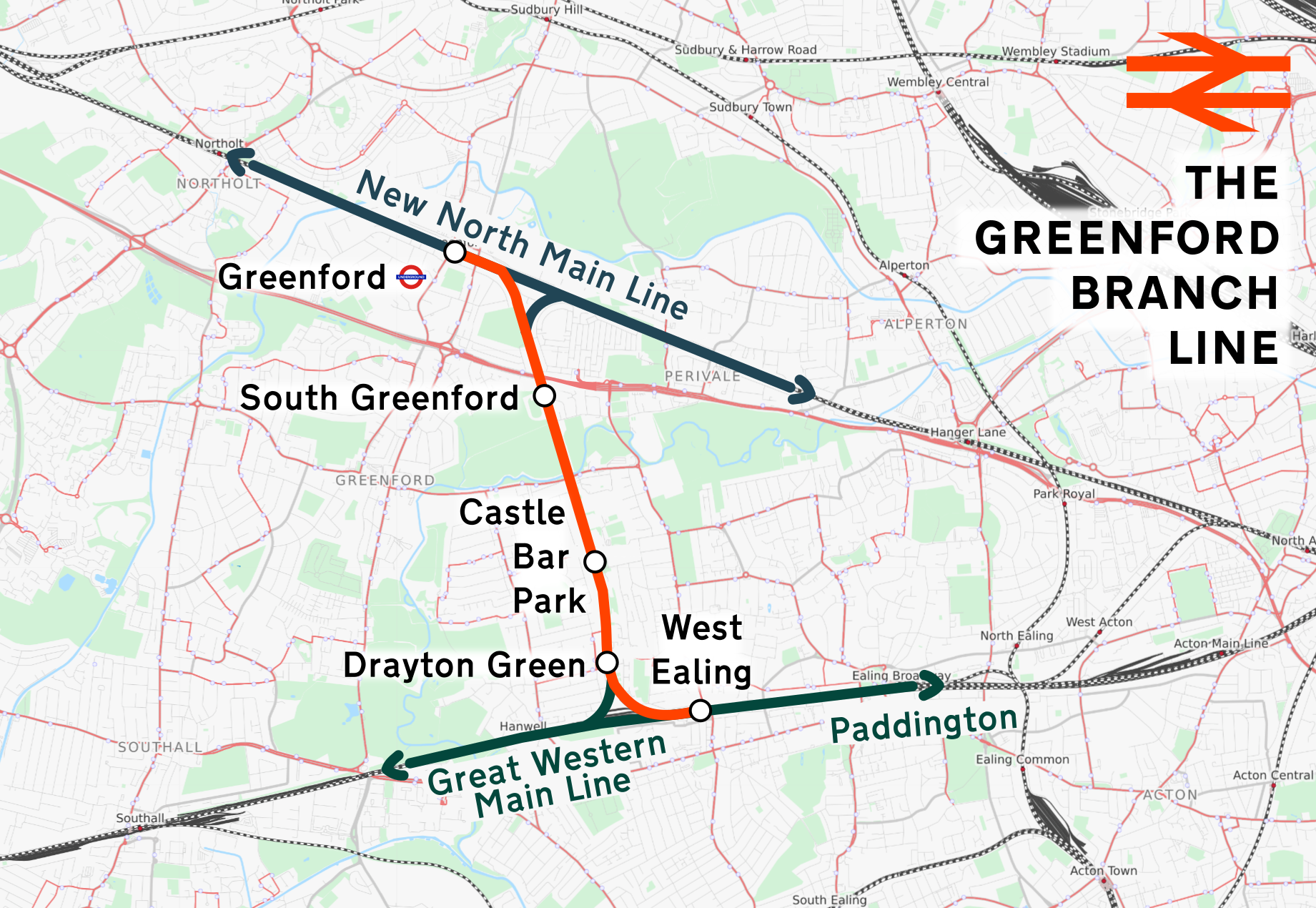
(Click to expand)

The Greenford branch line is a 2 miles 40 chains (4.0 km) Network Rail suburban railway line in west London, England. It runs northerly from a triangular junction with the Great Western Main Line west of West Ealing to a central bay platform at Greenford station, where it has cross-platform interchanges to the London Underground's Central line. A triangular junction near Greenford connects to the Acton–Northolt line (formerly the New North Main Line). The line serves mainly the suburbs of Ealing and Greenford.

== History ==
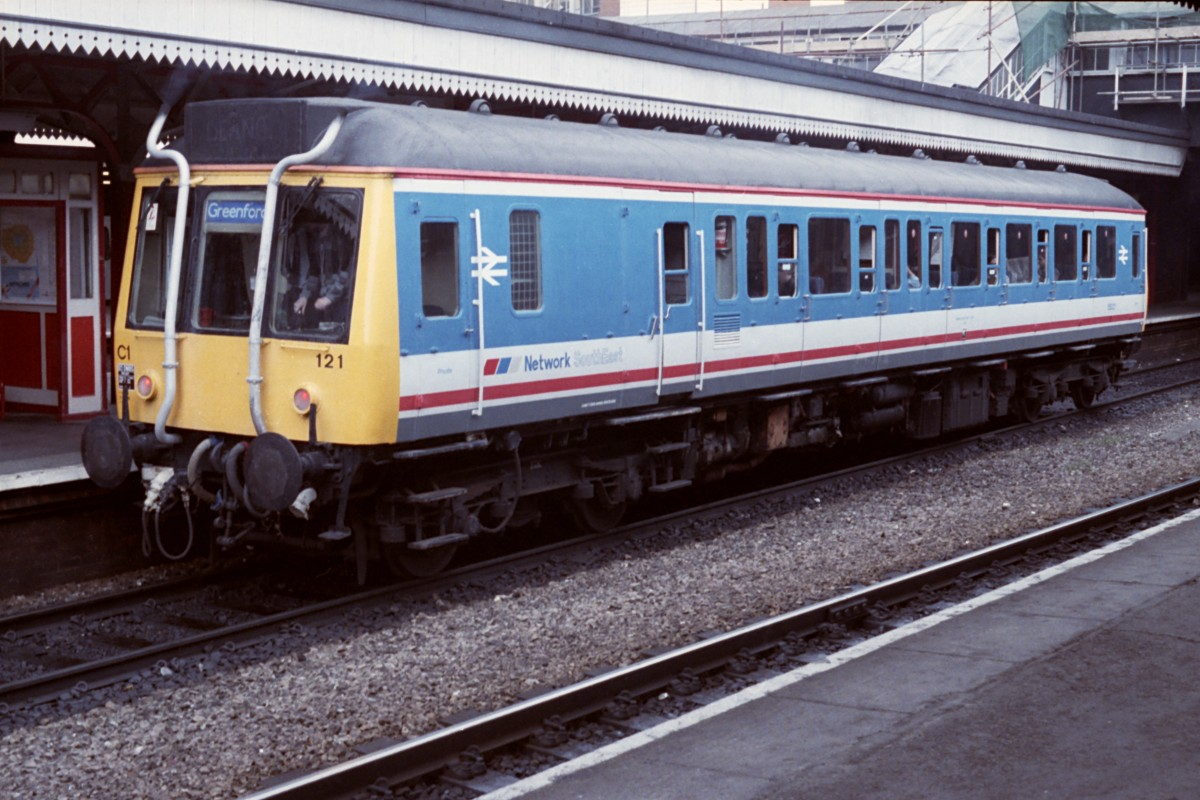
A Class 121 diesel multiple unit in BR Network SouthEast livery at London Paddington station for the Greenford service (1988).

The opening of the line in 1903 coincided with the opening of a station at Park Royal on the Acton–Northolt line to serve the Royal Agricultural Show held in the grounds of part of the Twyford Abbey Estate. The Show ran from 15 June 1903 to 4 July 1903 during which period trains operated a circular service to and from Paddington via Park Royal and Ealing. Normal services started on 2 May 1904 and the links to Greenford station were put in on 1 October 1904.

The loop formed by the GWML, the branch and the ANL is sometimes used for turning trains for operational reasons such as balancing wheel wear. On weekends in 2008 during engineering works on the West Coast Main Line the line was used by Virgin Trains' Euston-Birmingham International "Blockade Buster" service which ran to Euston via Willesden, Acton Main Line, Ealing Broadway, Greenford, High Wycombe, Banbury and Coventry using pairs of 5-car Voyager sets. On two Sundays in February 2010, Chiltern and Wrexham & Shropshire trains were diverted to Paddington via the line while engineering work blocked the route to Marylebone.

Locally the service is called the 'Push-and-pull', a term which dates from the days of steam, when the engine could not change ends at Greenford and so the locomotive pulled the carriages one way and pushed them on the return run (see GWR Autocoach). In the 1950s the service frequently ran with two auto-trailers, one either side of the engine.

During the 1960s and 1970s the service was normally operated by a Class 121 'Bubble Car' two-carriage diesel railcar, although this was later reduced to a single carriage.

As Drayton Green, Castle Bar Park and South Greenford have short platforms the maximum length of train that can be used is two cars.

In preparation for Crossrail, a new platform 5 was constructed at West Ealing, and most services now terminate there.

== Current service ==
The passenger service is provided by Great Western Railway. Trains on the branch run between Greenford and West Ealing, except for one service from Paddington at the start of the day, and to Paddington at the end of the day.

There was a parliamentary service operated by Chiltern Railways from 10 December 2018 that, on weekdays, started from South Ruislip and ran non-stop along the line to West Ealing, before returning to West Ruislip. It previously operated to High Wycombe, but was later curtailed. It then became unidirectional from West Ealing to West Ruislip, running once a week on Wednesday mornings. It was then replaced by a bus service operated by Metroline in 2022.

All services are operated with two-car Class 165 Turbo diesel trains, alongside one Class 230 battery-electric unit on Saturdays. There is no Sunday service.

=== Introduction of battery-powered rolling stock ===
In February 2022, GWR announced plans to test fast-charge battery technology on the route. As electrification on the route was low-priority, the only realistic alternative option to replace diesel-powered rolling stock was with battery power. The test will see the existing Class 165 units replaced by Class 230 battery-electric multiple unit trains produced by Vivarail, with the company's fast-charge equipment installed in the bay platform at West Ealing. This will entail the installation of a conductor rail that becomes live only when a train is above it. This is then used to charge the lithium-ion batteries on the train, a process that would take about ten minutes.

In March 2024, following delivery of unit 230 001 to GWR, trial running began of the new battery-powered train and fast-charge technology on the line. The trials demonstrated a charging time of 3½ minutes at West Ealing, using a bank of batteries installed adjacent to the platform, which charge continuously at a lower current, removing the need for expensive upgrades to the local supply network. GWR aim to build mileage on the technology to consider its introduction on other branch lines, such as the Windsor branch line, the Marlow branch line and the Henley branch line.

After over a year of operation, the trial was deemed a success, with a total cost of ownership per mile of £2.50 comparing very favourably against diesel and overhead catenary.

Unit 230 001 began passenger operations on the branch line on 31 January 2026, and is used for passenger services on Saturdays, alongside the 165 DMUs.

== Passenger volume ==
These are statistics of passenger usage on the National Rail network along the Greenford branch line from the year beginning April 2002 to the year starting April 2023.

Station usage
Station name	2002–03	2004–05	2005–06	2006–07	2007–08	2008–09	2009–10	2010–11	2011–12	2012–13	2013–14	2014–15	2015–16	2016–17	2017–18	2018–19	2019–20	2020–21	2021–22	2022–23	2023–24	2024–25
Greenford	No data	No data	No data	85,234	90,343	74,196	105,452	152,542	173,868	190,658	195,998	232,160	260,132	229,870	150,800	152,698	170,436	58,534	100,278	126,052	122,596	
South Greenford	7,018	5,804	6,106	14,207	16,059	14,524	16,480	31,888	31,292	38,360	41,338	47,324	62,184	53,110	26,502	28,084	28,382	8,810	13,462	20,706	38,330	
Castle Bar Park	40,678	13,522	19,893	97,363	100,705	92,768	84,868	124,492	124,364	144,182	158,806	180,504	188,120	151,942	80,386	79,866	81,088	26,778	41,128	66,670	101,564	
Drayton Green	6,039	6,597	5,254	75,414	80,235	66,908	67,552	104,732	106,874	123,038	137,600	152,710	153,146	102,372	33,578	29,228	31,610	7,146	10,846	16,082	20,198	
West Ealing	646,608	384,890	371,096	1,078,954	1,264,480	895,372	759,796	1,069,164	1,109,636	1,170,790	1,302,320	1,347,024	989,068	923,710	1,034,658	1,077,698	1,182,062	340,254	774,424	1,261,474	2,256,266	
The annual passenger usage is based on sales of tickets in stated financial years from Office of Rail and Road estimates of station usage. The statistics are for passengers arriving and departing from each station and cover twelve-month periods that start in April. Methodology may vary year on year. Usage since the period 2019–20 have been affected by the COVID-19 pandemic, especially the period 2020–23.

== Connections ==
- At Greenford: London Underground Central line.
- At West Ealing: Elizabeth line to Paddington, Heathrow Airport, and Hayes & Harlington.
