= London Borough of Ealing =

Coordinates: 51°30′N 0°20′W

- London borough
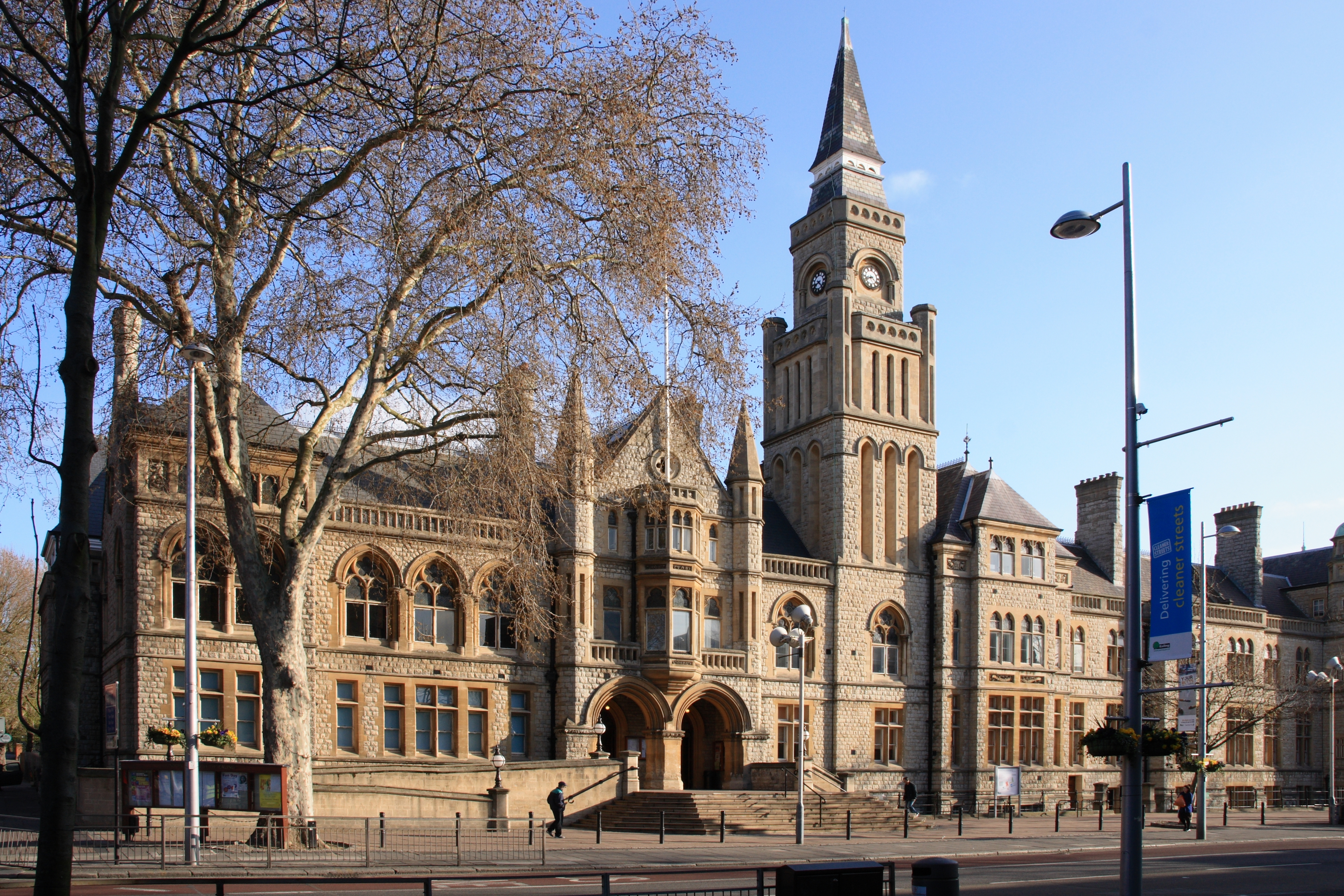
- Ealing Town Hall

- Coat of arms Council logo
- Motto: Progress with Unity
- Ealing shown within Greater London
- Sovereign state: United Kingdom
- Constituent country: England
- Region: London
- Ceremonial county: Greater London
- Created: 1 April 1965
- Admin HQ: Ealing Town Hall, Uxbridge Road, Ealing

Government
  - Type: London borough council
  - Body: Ealing London Borough Council
  - London Assembly: Bassam Mahfouz (L) AM for Ealing and Hillingdon
  - MPs: James Murray (L); Rupa Huq (L); Deirdre Costigan (L)

Area
  - Total: 21.44 sq mi (55.53 km^{2})
  - Rank: 239th (of 296)

Population (2025)
  - Total: 387,072
  - Rank: 21st (of 296)
  - Density: 18,050/sq mi (6,971/km^{2})
- Time zone: UTC (GMT)
  - Summer (DST): UTC+1 (BST)
- Postcodes: W, UB, NW, HA
- Area code: 020
- ISO 3166 code: GB-EAL
- ONS code: 00AJ
- GSS code: E09000009
- Police: Metropolitan Police
- Website: https://www.ealing.gov.uk

The London Borough of Ealing (/ˈiːlɪŋ/) is a London borough in London, England. It comprises the districts of Acton, Ealing, Greenford, Hanwell, Northolt, Perivale and Southall. With a population of 385,985 inhabitants as of 2024, it is the third most populous London borough.

Ealing is the third largest London borough in population and eleventh largest in area, covering part of west London and a small part of north-west London. It bridges Inner and Outer London. Its administrative centre is in Ealing Broadway. Ealing London Borough Council is the local authority.

Ealing has long been known as the "Queen of the Suburbs" due to its many parks and tree-lined streets; the term was coined in 1902 by borough surveyor Charles Jones. This is reflected by the tree emblem on its council logo and its coat of arms. Within the borough are two garden suburbs, Brentham Garden Suburb and Bedford Park. 330 hectares within the borough are designated as part of the Metropolitan Green Belt.

The neighbouring boroughs are (clockwise from north): Harrow, Brent, Hammersmith and Fulham, Hounslow and Hillingdon.

== History ==
A local government district called Ealing was created in 1863. Such districts were reconstituted as urban districts under the Local Government Act 1894. Ealing was then incorporated to become a municipal borough in 1901. The borough was significantly enlarged in 1926, when it absorbed the neighbouring urban districts of Greenford and Hanwell, and in 1928, when it absorbed the parish of Northolt.

The London Borough of Ealing was created in 1965 under the London Government Act 1963, covering the combined area of the former boroughs of Ealing, Acton and Southall. The area was transferred from Middlesex to Greater London to become one of the 32 London Boroughs.

== Districts ==
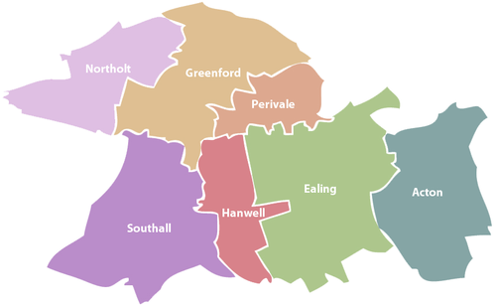
Map of the London Borough of Ealing showing the seven major towns within it

A map showing the wards of Ealing since 2002

Ealing borough is made up of seven major towns:

- Acton (W3)
- Ealing (W5, W13, NW10)
- Greenford (UB6)
- Hanwell (W7)
- Northolt (UB5)
- Perivale (UB6)
- Southall (UB1, UB2).

== Governance ==
The local authority is Ealing Council, which meets at Ealing Town Hall and has its main offices in the adjoining Perceval House on Uxbridge Road in Ealing.

=== Greater London representation ===
Since 2000, for elections to the London Assembly, the borough forms part of the Ealing and Hillingdon constituency.

=== UK Parliament ===
The London Borough of Ealing is represented by three Members of Parliament (MPs), elected in the following constituencies:

- Ealing Central and Acton
- Ealing North
- Ealing Southall

== London Fire Brigade ==
There are four fire stations within the London Borough of Ealing. Southall and Northolt have similar-sized station grounds and both house two pumping appliances. Southall attended some 700 incidents more than their Northolt counterparts in 2006/07. Ealing, with two pumping appliances, and Acton, one pump and two fire investigation units, are the other two appliances in the area. The ward of Northfield had over forty malicious calls made from it, more than twice as many as any other ward within Ealing.

== Education ==
Ealing has a total of 91 state-run schools and nurseries. There are 13 high schools under the domain of the local education authority, 12 of which are either comprehensive, foundation or voluntary-aided, and one city academy. The borough also has a number of independent schools.

== Demographics ==
Population pyramid of the Borough of Ealing in 2021

The borough of Ealing is ethnically diverse. In 2011, 49% gave their ethnicity as white, 30% as Asian, 15% as Afro Caribbean and 4.5% as of mixed or multiple ethnicity, the remaining identifying as Arab or other ethnicity. The main religions of the borough's population in 2011 were Christianity (44%), Islam (16%) Hinduism (9%) and Sikhism (8%); 15% stated they had no religion and a further 7% did not state any religion.

Population census
Year	Pop.	±%
1801	4,033	—
1811	4,578	+13.5%
1821	5,455	+19.2%
1831	6,510	+19.3%
1841	10,919	+67.7%
1851	11,434	+4.7%
1861	24,489	+114.2%
1871	37,544	+53.3%
1881	50,599	+34.8%
1891	67,976	+34.3%
1901	105,463	+55.1%
1911	163,628	+55.2%
1921	190,486	+16.4%
1931	221,801	+16.4%
1941	259,250	+16.9%
1951	303,029	+16.9%
1961	301,757	−0.4%
1971	300,577	−0.4%
1981	278,671	−7.3%
1991	281,743	+1.1%
2001	300,947	+6.8%
2011	338,449	+12.5%
2021	367,116	+8.5%
2024 estimate	385,985	+5.1%
Note:2024 estimate

=== Ethnicity ===
Ethnic Group	Year															
Ethnic Group	1961 estimations		1966 estimations		1971 estimations		1981 estimations		1991 census		2001 census		2011 census		2021	
Ethnic Group	Number	%	Number	%	Number	%	Number	%	Number	%	Number	%	Number	%	Number	%
White: Total	–	97.4%	–	94.3%	–	86.4%	204,056	77.2%	189,787	67.3%	176,741	58.8%	165,818	48.78%	158,463	43.2%
White: British	–	–	–	–	–	–	–	–	–	–	135,139	44.9%	103,035	30.4%	89,265	24.3%
White: Irish	–	–	–	–	–	–	–	–	–	–	14,285	4.7%	10,428	3.0%	8,511	2.3%
White: Gypsy or Irish Traveller	–	–	–	–	–	–	–	–	–	–	–	–	300	0.08%	248	0.1%
White: Roma	–	–	–	–	–	–	–	–	–	–	–	–	–	–	1,430	0.4%
White: Other	–	–	–	–	–	–	–	–	–	–	27,317	9%	52,055	15.3%	59,009	16.1%
Asian or Asian British: Total	–	–	–	–	–	–	42,520	16.1%	64,550	22.9%	73,851	24.5%	100,439	29.5%	111,241	30.3%
Asian or Asian British: Indian	–	–	–	3%	–	–	31,968	12.1%	45,949	16.3%	49,734	16.4%	48,240	14.2%	54,806	14.9%
Asian or Asian British: Pakistani	–	–	–	–	–	–	4,926		7,720		11,271	3.7%	14,711	4.3%	16,714	4.6%
Asian or Asian British: Bangladeshi	–	–	–	–	–	–	416		797		1,077	0.3%	1,786	0.5%	3,685	1.0%
Asian or Asian British: Chinese	–	–	–	–	–	–	1,544		2,538		3,596	1.1%	4,132	1.2%	4,526	1.2%
Asian or Asian British: Other Asian	–	–	–	–	–	–	3,666		7,546		11,769	3.9%	31,570	9.3%	31,510	8.6%
Black or Black British: Total	–	–	–	–	–	–	13,443	5.1%	20,044	7.1%	26,456	8.7%	36,860	10.7%	39,491	10.8%
Black or Black British: African	–	–	–	–	–	–	2448		4405		11,075	3.6%	17,299	5.1%	22,578	6.2%
Black or Black British: Caribbean	–	–	–	–	–	–	8,919	3.4%	12,599	4.5%	13,507	4.4%	13,192	3.8%	12,898	3.5%
Black or Black British: Other Black	–	–	–	–	–	–	2076		3040		1,874	0.6%	6,369	1.8%	4,015	1.1%
Mixed or British Mixed: Total	–	–	–	–	–	–	–	–	–	–	10,880	3.6%	15,066	4.2%	19,161	5.3%
Mixed: White and Black Caribbean	–	–	–	–	–	–	–	–	–	–	3,022	1%	3,939	1.1%	4,597	1.3%
Mixed: White and Black African	–	–	–	–	–	–	–	–	–	–	1,353	0.4%	1,989	0.5%	2,446	0.7%
Mixed: White and Asian	–	–	–	–	–	–	–	–	–	–	3,629	1.2%	4,653	1.3%	5,445	1.5%
Mixed: Other Mixed	–	–	–	–	–	–	–	–	–	–	2,876	0.9%	4,485	1.3%	6,673	1.8%
Other: Total	–	–	–	–	–	–					9,424	3.1%	20,266	5.8%	38,760	10.6%
Other: Arab	–	–	–	–	–	–	–	–	–	–	–	–	9,804	2.8%	16,105	4.4%
Other: Any other ethnic group	–	–	–	–	–	–	–	–	–	–	9,424	3.1%	10,462	3.0%	22,655	6.2%
Ethnic minority: Total	7,743	2.6%	16,770	5.7%	–	13.6%	60,180	22.8%	92,013	32.7%	124,207	41.2%	172,631	51.22%	208,653	56.8%
Total	301,646	100%	292,750	100%	–	100%	264,236	100%	281,800	100%	300,948	100.00%	338,449	100.00%	367,116	100%

Ethnicity of school pupils
Ethnic group	Year	
Ethnic group	1964	
Ethnic group	Number	%
White: Total	–	85%
Ethnic minority: Total	–	15%

=== Ethnic communities ===
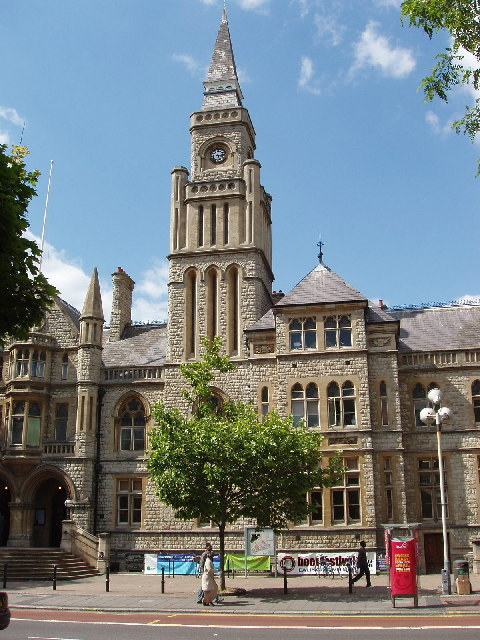
Ealing Town Hall, completed in 1888

The borough has a long-standing Irish community which is particularly visible through the number of established Irish pubs in the borough and the popularity of Gaelic games in the community. Country flags for example can be seen flown on the outside or hung inside of various pubs in the area, especially on St Patrick's Day. St Benedict's School has also had a long term affiliation with the Irish community in Ealing, as it is a Catholic school. Many Irish members of the Ealing borough attend Ealing Abbey which is linked to St Benedict's School.

Faith in Ealing (2021 census)
1. Christianity (37.8%)
2. No religion (19.1%)
3. Islam (18.8%)
4. Sikhism (7.80%)
5. Hinduism (7.70%)
6. Buddhism (1.10%)
7. Judaism (0.30%)
8. Other religion (0.70%)
9. 6.70%

Ealing has a large British-Polish community that owes its origins to the World War II refugees and Polish armed forces finding both cheap accommodation and work in the Acton area, which then had a high proportion of London's light engineering companies involved with government war contracts. This community has grown considerably including more shops with authentic Polish food since Poland joined the European Union and its migrant workers have been able to come to the UK freely; in 2011 the borough had the UK's highest proportion of Polish speakers at 6% of the population. This has also led to an increase in Polish social centres in the borough. The population is highly concentrated in Acton, Greenford and Perivale.

Southall in the west of the borough is home to one of the largest South Asian communities in the UK, the majority of whom are Sikhs. The community first developed in the 1950s. The Asian population makes up 80% of Southall Broadway ward as of 2011, a contrast compared to the 8% of Southfield ward in the borough's east.

The most noticeable Afro-Caribbean populations in the borough are in the areas of Northolt and Acton. Of the residents in the Northolt West End ward (as of 2011), 19.4% of them were of Afro-Caribbean heritage, with a relatively large proportion of these being Somali. 16.1% of the South Acton ward was black, whilst 15.9% of the East Acton ward was black. The Caribbean population of Ealing Borough is also mostly concentrated in these two wards of Acton.

In a speech to mark the 70th anniversary of the Indian Journalists' Association and of Indian independence on 15 August 1947 North Ealing MP Stephen Pound said: "There is North Ealing, South Ealing and Darjeeling" referring to the relatively large Asian population.

There are also churches and centres for London's Hungarian and Assyrian communities in South Ealing.

This list includes top-15 sources of immigration to Borough of Ealing for 2021 census:

#	Country	Number
1	India	31,819
2	Poland	18,816
3	Pakistan	7,757
4	Afghanistan	7,006
5	Sri Lanka	6,020
6	Somalia	5,848
7	Ireland	5,316
8	Italy	5,243
9	Romania	4,986
10	Iraq	4,779
11	Iran	3,796
12	Kenya	3,760
13	Japan	2,974
14	France	2,780
15	Syria	2,747

=== Other demographics ===
As of the 2011 census, Hanger Hill had, at 13%, the largest proportion of people aged 65 and over. The lowest were East Acton and Southall Green, at 8% each.

== Sport and leisure ==
Ealing is home to Ealing Studios, and was a major centre of the UK film industry. Brentford F.C. draw a large amount of local support from the borough, although Griffin Park is situated just outside the borough, in the neighbouring London Borough of Hounslow.

The borough is represented in Rugby Union by Ealing Trailfinders, Wasps RFC, Hanwell RFC, Old Priorian, Northolt and West London RFC.

The borough has four non-League football clubs Hanwell Town F.C. and Southall F.C. which both play at Reynolds Field in Perivale. The other two clubs are London Tigers F.C., which plays at the Avenue Park Stadium in Greenford and North Greenford United F.C., which plays at Berkeley Fields.

The borough is also home to one of the country's top athletics clubs, with Ealing Southall and Middlesex AC based at Perivale Athletics Track. The club has a successful history, with many national and international honours, including the double Olympic gold medallist, Kelly Holmes. In 2020 the club celebrated their 100th anniversary.

== Transport ==
=== Rail and London Underground ===
The numerous National Rail and London Underground stations in the borough are:

- Acton Central railway station
- Acton Main Line railway station
- Acton Town tube station
- Boston Manor tube station
- Castle Bar Park railway station
- Chiswick Park tube station
- Drayton Green railway station
- Ealing Broadway station
- Ealing Common tube station
- Greenford station
- Hanger Lane tube station
- Hanwell railway station
- North Acton tube station
- North Ealing tube station
- Northfields tube station
- Northolt Park railway station
- Northolt tube station
- Park Royal tube station
- Perivale tube station
- South Acton railway station
- South Ealing tube station
- South Greenford railway station
- Southall railway station
- West Acton tube station
- West Ealing railway station

=== Travel to work ===
In March 2011, the main forms of transport that residents used to travel to work were: driving a car or van, 21.8% of all residents aged 16–74; underground, metro, light rail, tram, 18.0%; bus, minibus or coach, 9.2%; on foot, 4.7%; train, 4.0%; work mainly at or from home, 3.0%; bicycle, 2.0%.

=== Transport development ===
In April 2009 the council voted to call on Transport for London to look into the proposal for a North and West London Light Railway.

== Town twinning ==
Ealing is twinned with:

- The district of Bielany, Warsaw, Masovian Voivodeship, Poland;
- The town of Marcq-en-Barœul, Nord, Hauts-de-France, France;
- The district of Steinfurt, North Rhine-Westphalia, Germany
