= West Ealing railway station =

National Rail station in London, England

West Ealing
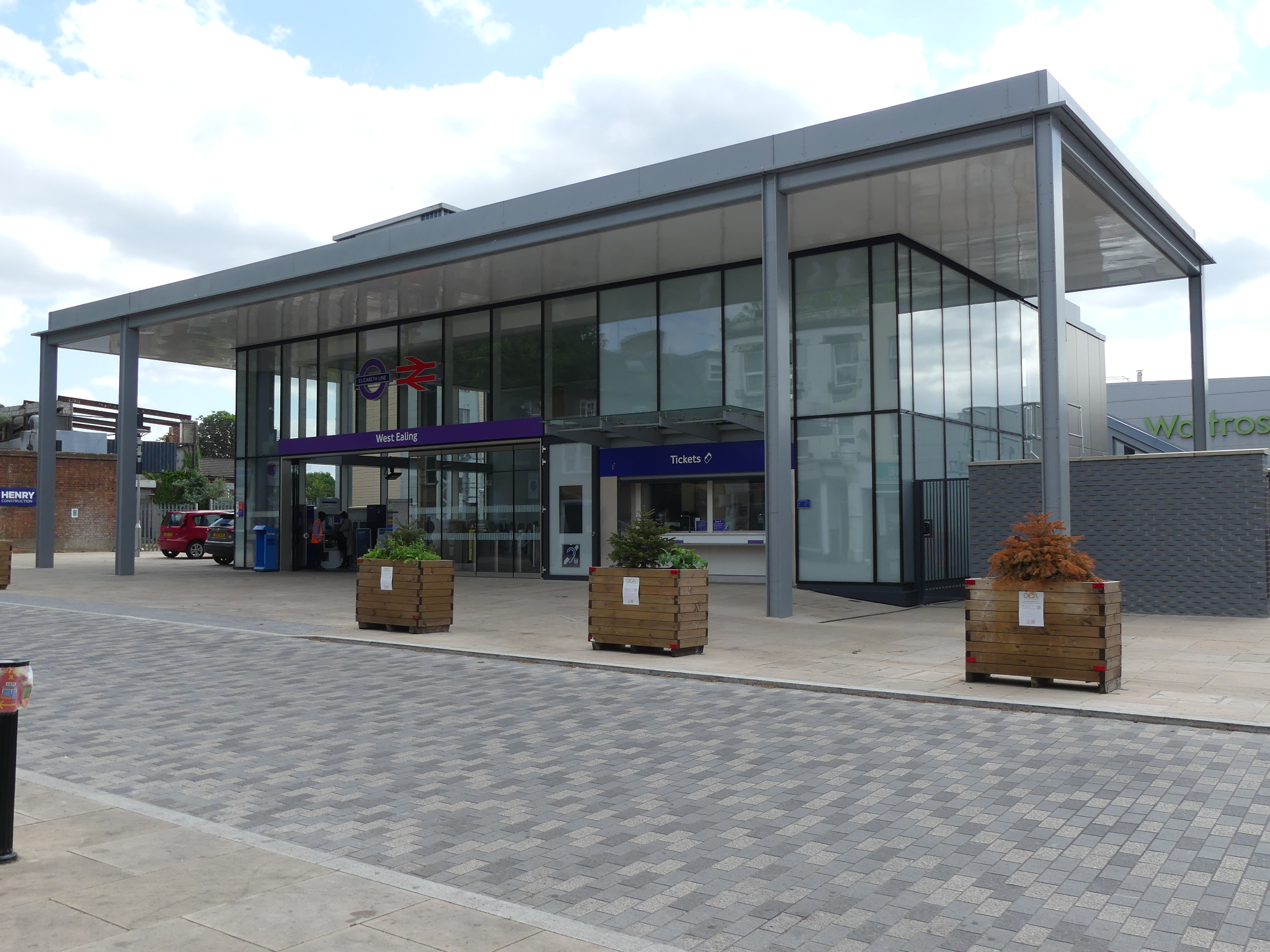
- Station entrance seen in May 2022
- Interactive map of West Ealing

General information
- Location: West Ealing
- Local authority: London Borough of Ealing
- Grid reference: TQ166807
- Managed by: Elizabeth line
- Owner: Network Rail
- Station code: WEA
- DfT category: E
- Number of platforms: 3
- Tracks: 5
- Accessible: Yes
- Fare zone: 3

National Rail annual entry and exit
- 2020–21: ▼0.340 million
- Interchange: ▼15,194
- 2021–22: ▲0.774 million
- Interchange: ▲28,755
- 2022–23: ▲1.261 million
- Interchange: ▲31,302
- 2023–24: ▲2.256 million
- Interchange: ▲77,895
- 2024–25: ▲2.549 million
- Interchange: ▲93,991

Railway companies
- Original company: Great Western Railway
- Pre-grouping: Great Western Railway
- Post-grouping: Great Western Railway

Key dates
- 4 June 1838: Line opened
- 1 March 1871: Station opened as Castle Hill
- 1875: Renamed Castle Hill Ealing Dean
- 1 March 1883: District Railway service introduced
- 30 September 1885: District Railway service ceased
- 1 July 1899: Renamed West Ealing

Other information
- External links: Departures; Facilities
- Coordinates: 51.5137°N 0.3203°W

West Ealing railway station is on the Great Western Main Line in Ealing, situated in west London. It is 6 miles 46 chains (10.6 km) down the line from London Paddington and is situated between Ealing Broadway to the east and Hanwell to the west. Its three-letter station code is WEA.

Most trains serving the station are operated by the Elizabeth line running between Abbey Wood and Heathrow Terminal 4. Services on the Greenford branch line to Greenford are operated by Great Western Railway.

== History ==
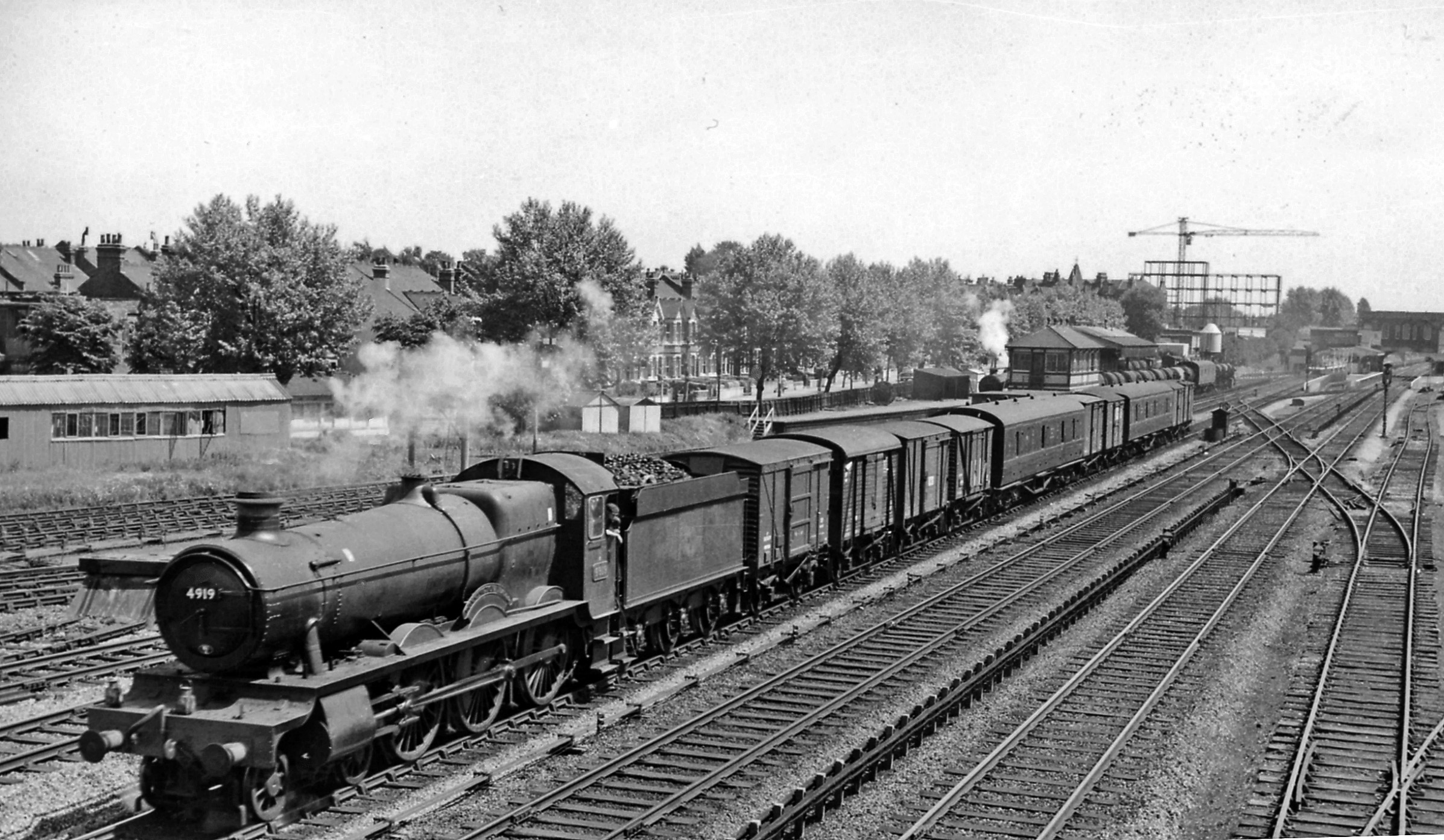
The original station building visible in the distance, on the far right, in 1962. The milk dock is visible near the centre; platform 1 and its siding are visible on the extreme right.

The station was opened on 1 March 1871 as Castle Hill on the Great Western Railway, which was constructed from London Paddington through Ealing to Maidenhead in 1836–1838. The station was renamed Castle Hill Ealing Dean in 1875. From 1 March 1883, the station was served by District Railway services running between Mansion House and Windsor. This service was discontinued as uneconomic after 30 September 1885. On 1 July 1899, the station was renamed West Ealing.

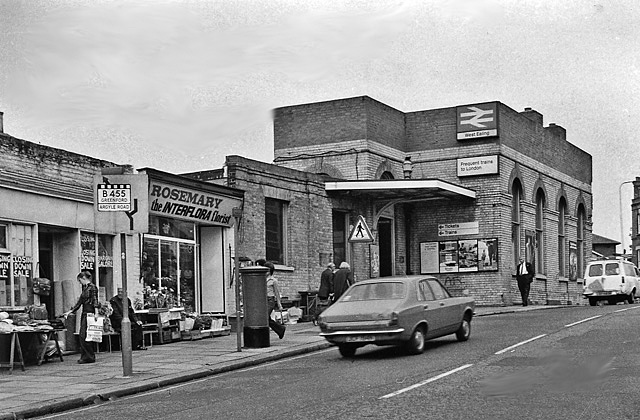
The original station building in 1978

Originally the station consisted of four platforms in a staggered layout: platform 1 (along with a siding) and the island comprising platforms 2 and 3 to the west of the Drayton Green Road bridge, and platform 4 on the east side. The station was located next to the London Co-operative Society's main creamery, and so was equipped with a dedicated milk train platform in the mid-1900s.

Platform 1 and its siding were demolished in the late 1960s; platform 4 was demolished and moved west of the bridge by early 1990, partially covering the site of the then long-closed milk depot; platform 2 was partially demolished and fenced off by early 1991 as trains on the main line no longer served the station. The remains of the milk train platform can still be seen today, next to platform 5.

From around 1985 to 1990, access to the original platform 4 was opposite the station building, across Drayton Green Road bridge. The previous station building (which is now closed) was completed in early 1987, following demolition of the previous century-old building a year earlier.

Since October 2008, Oyster "pay as you go" can be used for journeys originating or ending at West Ealing.

In December 2018, Chiltern Railways commenced operating a once per day parliamentary service on weekdays from South Ruislip and to High Wycombe via the Greenford line. It replaced a service to London Paddington via the Acton–Northolt line. It became once a week on Wednesdays only after the COVID-19 pandemic. It ran for the last time on 7 December 2022, when it was replaced by a bus service.

=== Crossrail ===
West Ealing was first proposed to be part of the Crossrail project in the 1990s. In 2003, initial public consultation proposed that no Crossrail services would stop at the station. Following criticism, it was proposed that services would call at the station 7 days a week, with station improvements including a new ticket hall and step-free access. However, the Greenford branch line would terminate at the station at a new platform, to allow for a greater number of services to run into Paddington. In May 2011, Network Rail announced that it would deliver improvements and alterations to prepare the station for Crossrail services.

In 2015, the station design was approved by Ealing Council, allowing construction to commence. The work would include a new station building designed by Bennetts Associates with access from Manor Road, a new platform for the Greenford branch, platform extensions and step-free access to all platforms. Outside the station, public realm improvements funded by Transport for London and Ealing Borough Council would include a raised speed table with granite paving, widened pavements, street trees and cycle parking.

In September 2016, Great Western Railway began operating services from Paddington with Class 387 trains, which led to most Greenford services that had previously run to Paddington to terminate at West Ealing, using the newly built platform 5. In June 2017, it was announced that completion of the station was delayed until 2019. In December 2017, MTR Crossrail took over management of the station from Great Western Railway, with TfL Rail services running from May 2018, transferring to the Elizabeth line in May 2022. In 2019, contracts for the new station building was awarded, allowing construction of the new station building.

Following delays due to the COVID-19 pandemic, the new station building opened on 25 March 2021, providing step free access to all platforms. The existing station building on Drayton Green Road was permanently closed.

=== Accidents and incidents ===
On 5 August 1989, an express passenger train travelling from Oxford to Paddington collided with a piece of rail left on the track, probably by vandals, and the locomotive, Class 50 50025 Invincible, was derailed along the points near to platform 2 (these points were removed by November of that year). There were no serious injuries.

== Services ==
Services at West Ealing are operated by the Elizabeth line and Great Western Railway using Class 345, 165 and 230 multiple units.

As of the December 2024 timetable, the typical Monday to Friday off-peak service is:

- 4 tph (trains per hour) westbound to Heathrow Terminal 4 (Elizabeth line)
- 2 tph westbound to Heathrow Terminal 5 (Elizabeth line)
- 4 tph eastbound to Abbey Wood (Elizabeth line)
- 2 tph eastbound to Shenfield (Elizabeth line)
- 2 tph to Greenford (Great Western Railway)

A Sunday service was introduced at the station in May 2019. Prior to this, the station was closed on Sundays. The services to Greenford do not run on Sundays.

The station was also served by a very limited Chiltern Railways service of one train per week to West Ruislip on Wednesdays only. It last ran on 7 December 2022, being replaced by a bus service.

Preceding station	Elizabeth line	Following station
Hanwell towards Heathrow Terminal 4	Elizabeth line	Ealing Broadway towards Abbey Wood
Hayes & Harlington towards Heathrow Terminal 5	Elizabeth line	Ealing Broadway towards Shenfield
Preceding station	National Rail	Following station
Drayton Green	Great Western Railway Greenford branch line Monday-Saturday only	Terminus
Historical services
Preceding station	London Underground	Following station
Hanwell towards Windsor	District line	Ealing Broadway towards Mansion House

== Connections ==
London Buses routes E7 and E11 serve the station.
