= British Rail Class 230 =

Diesel-electric, diesel-battery or battery electric multiple unit passenger train

British Rail Class 230 D-Train
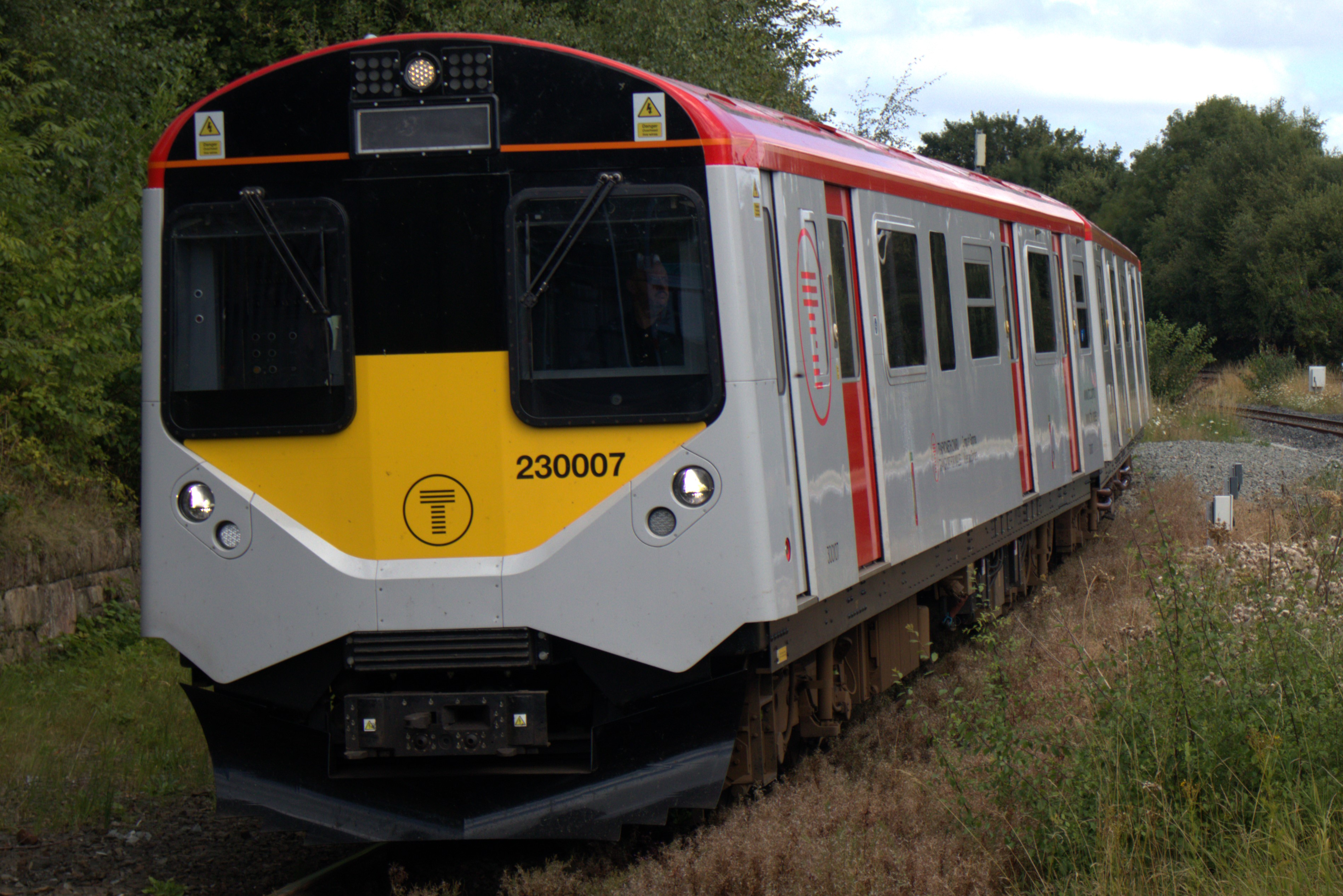
- Transport for Wales Class 230 approaching Wrexham General in 2024

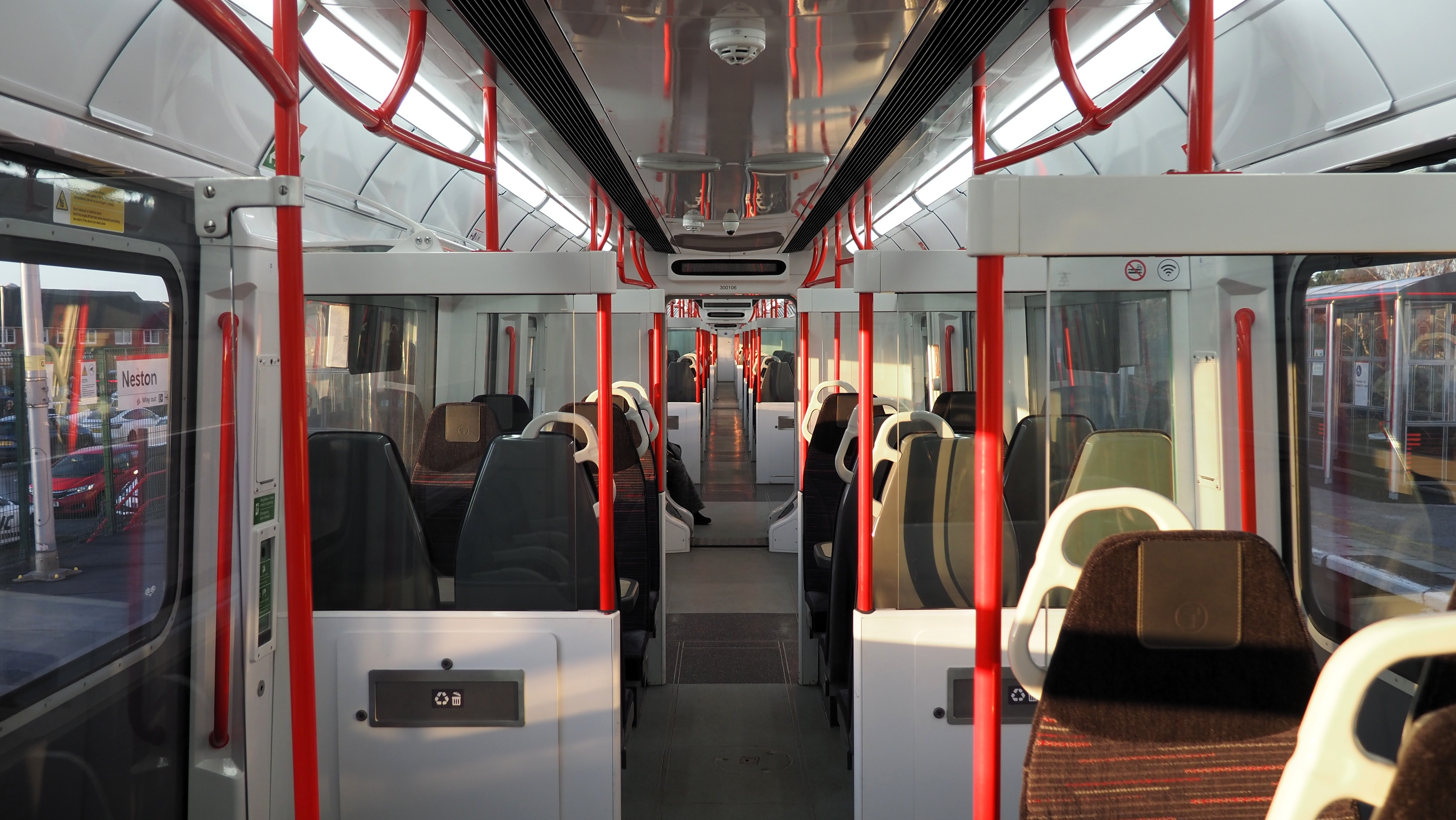
- Interior of a Transport for Wales unit
- In service: 23 April 2019 – present
- Manufacturers: Metro-Cammell (as D78 Stock); Vivarail (conversion)
- Family name: D-Train
- Replaced: Class 150; Class 153; Class 165
- Constructed: 2015–2022
- Number built: 11
- Successor: Class 150 (London Northwestern Railway)
- Formation: 2 or 3 cars per unit
- Fleet numbers: 230001–230011
- Operators: Current: Transport for Wales; Great Western Railway; Former: London Northwestern Railway
- Depot: TfW: Birkenhead North

Specifications
- Car body construction: Aluminium
- Car length: Driving vehicles: 18.652 m (61 ft 2 in); Intermediate vehicles: 18.399 m (60 ft 4 in)
- Width: 2.840 m (9 ft 4 in)
- Height: 3.703 m (12 ft 2 in) (Note: The roof peak of D78 Stock units is 3,630 mm (11 ft 11 in) above rail level, but Class 230 units have an additional 73 mm (3 in) of suspension height for gauging reasons.)
- Doors: Single-leaf sliding pocket, each 1.127 m (3 ft 8 in) wide
- Wheel diameter: 790–710 mm (31.10–27.95 in) (new–worn)
- Wheelbase: Bogies: 2.200 m (7 ft 3 in); Bogie centres: 11.885 m (39 ft 0 in)
- Maximum speed: 60 mph (97 km/h)
- Prime mover: 4 × Ford Duratorq 3.2 TDCi
- Engine type: Inline-5 4-stroke turbo-diesel with EGR
- Displacement: 3.19 L (195 cu in) per engine
- Traction motors: 8 × TSA TME 32-43-4, each of 56 kW (75 hp)
- Power output: 588 kW (789 hp) total (147 kW (197 hp) per engine)
- UIC classification: 2-car units: Bo′Bo′+Bo′Bo′
- Bogies: Bombardier
- Braking system: Electro-pneumatic
- Safety systems: AWS; TPWS
- Coupling system: Wedglock
- Track gauge: 1,435 mm (4 ft 8 1/2 in) standard gauge

The British Rail Class 230 D-Train is a diesel-electric multiple unit, diesel-battery electric multiple unit or battery electric multiple unit built by rolling stock manufacturer Vivarail for the British rail network. The units are converted from old London Underground D78 Stock, originally manufactured in 1980 by Metro-Cammell, and have been assigned the designation of Class 230 under TOPS.

The conversion re-uses the D78's aluminium bodyshells with new interiors. It runs on the same bogies but these are rebuilt to as-new standard by Wabtec and fitted with brand-new three-phase AC induction motors sourced from Austria. The initial build of three vehicles for London Northwestern Railway replaces the four-rail traction-current system with four diesel gen-sets, driving eight traction motors via purpose-built electronic traction control units. In this configuration, every wheel is driven and all are braked by a computer-controlled blended reactive/pneumatic braking system, allowing for optimum braking performance in all weather conditions.

In August 2016, a prototype was produced for testing and accreditation; the type was planned to be prepared to enter passenger service during the following year. During July 2016, it was announced that the prototype was to be tested in mainline service on the Coventry to Nuneaton Line over a 12-month period with operator London Midland; however, this trial deployment had to be postponed after the prototype was damaged by a fire and could not be repaired quickly enough. It is proposed that up to 75 units may be converted, with each unit consisting of two or three cars. During October 2017, West Midlands Trains announced that it would procure three 2-car D-Trains for the Marston Vale line and the first unit entered service in April 2019. Transport for Wales' units started passenger service on the Borderlands line on 3 April 2023. In 2025, battery electric unit 230001 set the world record for the longest train journey on a single battery charge, travelling 200.5 miles (322.7 km) on the Great Western Main Line.

== History ==
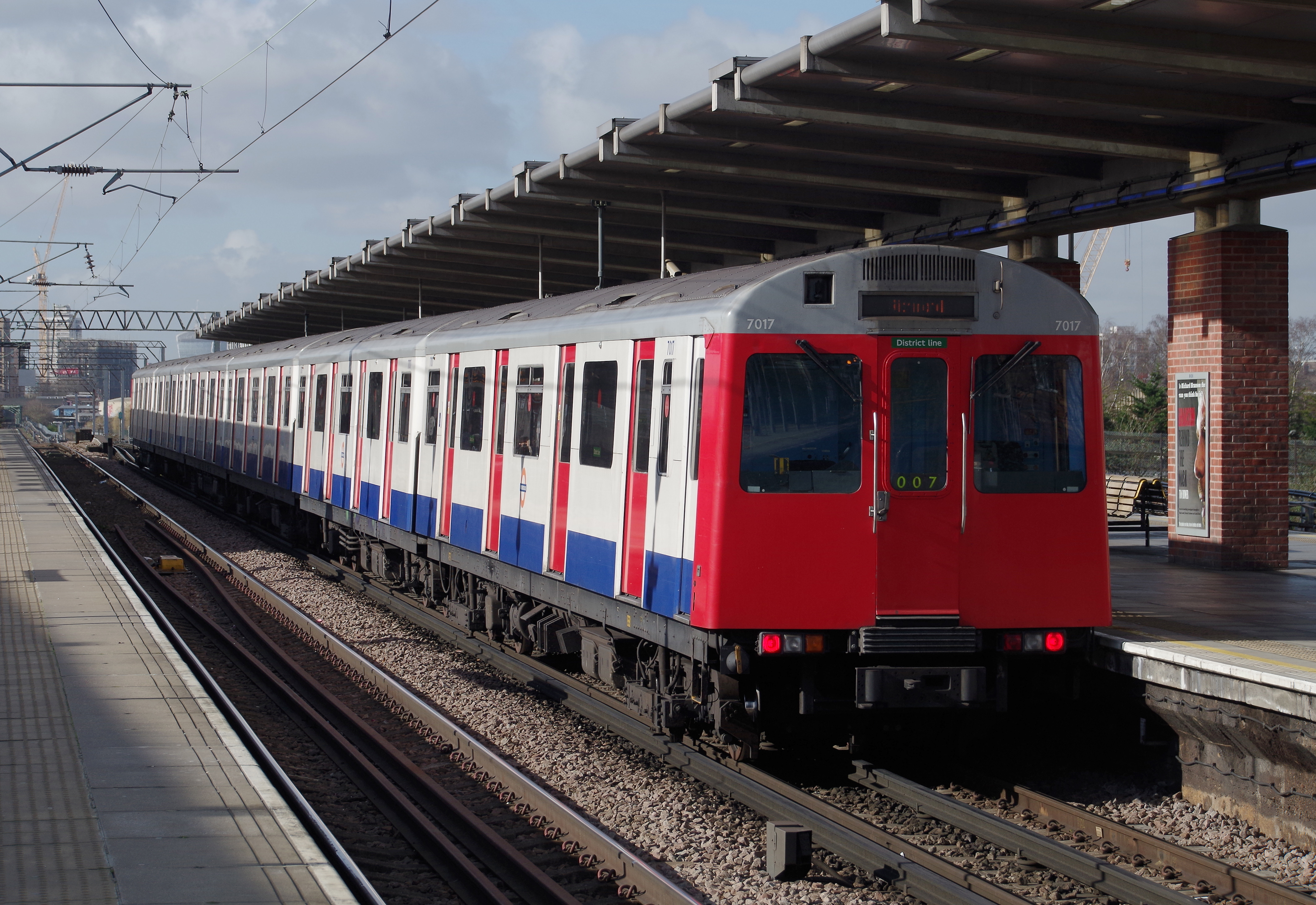
Pre-conversion London Underground D78 Stock at West Ham station

During November 2014, Vivarail purchased 150 driving motor cars and 300 carriages of London Underground D78 Stock, which has been replaced by S Stock before the end of their lifespan, so that the subsurface lines (Circle, District, Hammersmith & City and Metropolitan) could have a common rolling stock fleet compatible with a new ATO system. The stated purpose of the D-train is to ameliorate a perceived shortage of affordable, modern rolling stock on Britain's regional rail routes, resulting from the slow pace of electrification. In the conversion programme, the company re-uses the bodyshells and bogies from the D78 units, and fits them out with new diesel engines and interiors.

Two prototype units were operated by Vivarail, designated as 230001 and 230002. The diesel-electric multiple unit (DEMU) 230001 is a three-car unit; each of these is outfitted with passenger fitting and fixtures, including seats, tables, a single toilet, onboard Wi-Fi, and electrical charging points. 230001 retains the original Brush traction motors, but subsequent units make use of AC motors from Traktionssysteme Austria.

Unit 230002, which was completed during 2018, is a battery electric multiple unit, designed for operating on partially electrified routes. It features four 106 kWh battery rafts, which provide for an operational range of 40 miles (64 km), requiring an eight-minute charge after each journey. The battery-powered train can be charged through an automatic charging point. Alternative means of charging the two-car vehicle include the use of a static battery bank to provide an electric supply of either 11 kV or 33 kV. The train requires a minimum of 750 V to operate.

The first D78 units were delivered to Vivarail on 19 January 2015; conversion of a single-car prototype to facilitate testing and marketing activities commenced shortly thereafter. By summer 2016, this prototype was complete and running live tests upon Vivarail's own 2.5-mile (4.0 km) test track. During November 2016, main line testing of the units began, the prototype unit being based at the Tyseley Locomotive Works while it was operating to and from Leamington Spa railway station. In December 2016 one of the units caught fire during testing, leading to the postponement of further trials. During March 2017, it was announced that testing of the battery-powered demonstrator had commenced at the Quinton Rail Technology Centre. In February 2018, Vivarail announced that its first two-car battery unit was approaching completion and was projected to run on the main line network during that summer.

The first unit entered service with West Midlands Trains (as London Northwestern Railway) on the Marston Vale Line on 23 April 2019. The D78 Stock had previously operated on the London Underground until 21 April 2017.

Vivarail, the manufacturer of the class, entered administration in December 2022. The resulting cessation of maintenance service caused London Northwestern to withdraw their fleet from service.

=== Showcases ===
The first Class 230 service to carry passengers operated on 21 and 22 June 2017 when the prototype (230001) was used to operate a shuttle service from Honeybourne to the Rail Live exhibition at the Quinton Rail Technology Centre.

The next unit – 230002, a battery-electric multiple unit – operated shuttles at the same location for the Rail Live 2018 event between 20 and 21 June. The same unit also went to the Bo'ness and Kinneil Railway for a public trial to show the use of battery trains. It was later redecorated and shipped to the United States, and as of November 2021 was involved in demonstrating the Railroad Development Corporation's "pop-up metro" concept at the Rockhill Trolley Museum in Pennsylvania. The pop-up metro concept aims to provide a "complete package" of trains, platforms, operating rules, and support functions that can help to demonstrate the feasibility and value of investing in introducing, or reintroducing, regular passenger services on lines that are currently not served.

== Design ==
The Class 230 D-Train is a family of trains, functioning either as a diesel electric multiple unit or a battery EMU dependent upon the configuration used, developed and produced by Vivarail for use on the National Rail network. According to the manufacturer, it is to be available in different layouts with various amenities, which are to be configured in order to conform with the specific requirements of a given operator to better adapt the vehicle for its operating environment. In general, the D-Train is to be fitted with accessible toilets, refreshment trolleys, at-seat tables, Wi-Fi, storage and iPad holders. Rail reported that each car is furnished with two underfloor engine-generator sets; Vivarail has claimed that the fuel consumption is roughly 0.5 litre per car per mile (7.5 miles per gallon per car); this is about half the fuel consumption of a Pacer. That information applies to two-car units; three-car units instead have four gensets in the centre car and none in the driving cars. The maximum speed is 60 mph (97 km/h).

When adapted to its City configuration, a single D-Train would operate as either two or three cars per unit. The two-car vehicle is to be configured to accommodate 86 seats per unit and, including standing room, provides for a total passenger capacity of 188. The three-car vehicle, when fitted with 140 longitudinal seats, will have a total passenger capacity of 294, including those standing. For the Country layout, each D-train unit is to be a three-car formation, which would accommodate 163 seats along with a total capacity of 291. In its Commuter variant, the D-Train features either two or three cars per unit. The two-car vehicle accommodates 114 mixed-type seats for a total carrying capacity of 188 passengers. The three-car vehicle, furnished with 172 longitudinal seats, accommodated up to 297 passengers, while the three-car vehicle with 154 transverse seats will carry 147 standing passengers additionally.

The construction practices for producing the D-Train have been promoted as being carbon-neutral as a result of deliberate efforts to reduce the levels of waste, energy consumption, time and costs involved. Much of the savings has been attributed to the reuse of many high-quality elements of the original D-stock rolling stock. Emission-reduction measures have been taken, including the adoption of a diesel engine that incorporates a start-stop system, while the use of trackside maintenance practices has been promoted as contributing to meaningful empty mileage fuel savings as well as lessening its impact upon the environment. The manufacturer promotes the type as being more economical to purchase, operate and maintain, and as well as for its ease of serviceability during a short duration. The D-Train has been anticipated to offer a service life in excess of 25 years.

The trains themselves are former D78 Stock units, originally manufactured by Metro-Cammell of Birmingham. 150 driving motor cars and 150 intermediate trailer cars were purchased at scrap value. The bogies were supplied by Canadian rolling stock manufacturer Bombardier while the D78 Stock was in service with London Underground. The 3.2-litre, five-cylinder diesel engines are manufactured by Ford in South Africa. Lithium Werks (formerly Valance) is the supplier of the battery rafts, while the electronic power control systems are produced by Strukton Rail. The three-phase AC traction motors are sourced from specialist Traktionssysteme Austria. Reportedly, the design of the D-Train is compliant with current rail industry emission standards, including the applicable elements of its automotive technology.

== Marketing ==
=== Overview ===
Vivarail stated that it planned to pitch the converted trains to a number of train operating companies (TOCs), especially those bidding for the Northern franchise which was awarded in December 2015. The company positioned the D-Train as being a cost-effective alternative to buying brand new rolling stock, enabling TOCs to replace the Pacer railbuses in the north of England with upcycled Underground stock. However, Arriva won the bidding for the Northern franchise in December 2015 with a rolling stock plan that included the procurement of brand new stock, as well as internal and external cascades of existing multiple units.

According to BBC Look East, Vivarail was in talks with bidders for the East Anglia franchise. However, the proposal drew criticism from the Rail Maritime and Transport Union as being a scheme to provide "second-hand" trains to the region instead of new stock. While the East Anglia franchise includes some very rural routes where previously only single carriage trains were used, the successful bidder opted for new stock instead.

=== Potential customers ===
In May 2015, it was claimed Arriva Trains Wales was to open talks with Vivarail over taking on converted D78s. Under a recent franchise agreement, FirstGroup (operator of the Great Western Railway franchise) has agreed to carry out a study on the use of overhauled Vivarail D-Trains on branch lines by the end of the year, possibly leading to a trial of the units.

During September 2015, it was revealed that Coventry City Council was looking into the possibility of using converted D78s to run additional services on the Coventry to Nuneaton Line; this would be especially useful to serve Coventry Arena station during match days at the Coventry Building Society Arena, as well as to alleviate a shortage of rolling stock. London Midland subsequently announced in July 2016 its intention to run a prototype three-car set for a year-long trial on this line before the prototype unit caught fire during testing which led to the trial being cancelled.

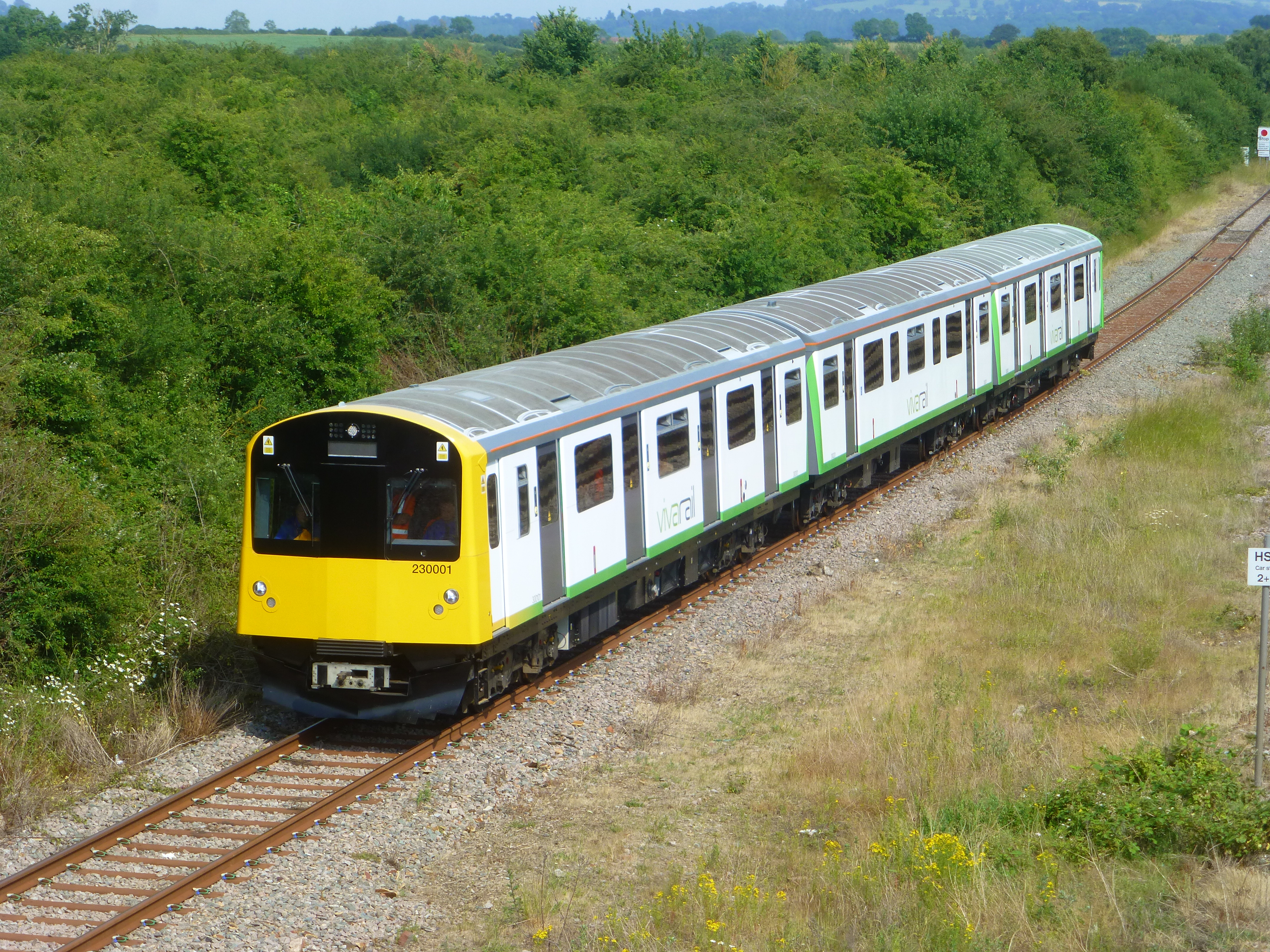
Prototype D-train at the test track at Long Marston in Warwickshire

In June 2016, a revived version of open access operator Go-Op was proposed to Office of Rail & Road. The proposed service would run from 2019 between Taunton and Nuneaton via Swindon and Oxford. Under the filed plans, Go-Op intended to use a number of Class 230s between Taunton and Swindon between December 2017 and 2019. However, it did not plan to operate these trains across the full route.

In late 2017, Vivarail announced that it had sent a brochure detailing the potential of the Class 230 for use on the Valley Lines network in South Wales to the bidders for the new Wales & Borders franchise. These would be battery-powered variants, capable of recharging via 25 kV OHLE which is expected to be installed. In June 2018, it was announced that successful bidder KeolisAmey Wales would purchase five units, but diesel-battery-electric and for use on the Borderlands Line between North Wales and North West England.

During March 2018, it was announced that plans were being developed to take a Class 230 to the United States, in order to demonstrate how they could provide a low-cost rolling stock option for new passenger services. It was revealed in late March 2021 that the unit was battery-electric unit 230002. The unit was shipped to the United States by April 2021.

In October 2018, it was reported in Modern Railways magazine that South Western Railway had submitted plans to the Department for Transport to replace the 80-year-old Class 483 units with Class 230 units on its Island Line services, but an announcement on 16 September 2019 confirmed that the Isle of Wight units would be Vivarail's third rail electric Class 484, which are also converted D78 stock.

=== Cost comparison ===
Vivarail reported in October 2015 its own analysis on how it believed the lease and ongoing costs of the Class 230 cars compared to procuring a new DMU and against existing Class 150 carriages. Modern Railways observed "Vivarail makes no allowance for non-capital rental costs, which suggests that there is no provision for amortisation or major mid-life overhaul as would be the case with a new train"

Comparison	New DMU	Class 150	Class 230
Length of carriages	23.8 m (78 ft 1 in)	20 m (65 ft 7 in)	18 m (59 ft 1 in)
Maximum speed	100 mph (160 km/h)	75 mph (121 km/h)	60 mph (97 km/h)
Seated capacity (two-car set)	123 (2+2)	124 (3+2)	114 (mixed)
Lease rental per car per month	£15,000	£7,500	£7,000
Non-capital lease rental per car per month	£6,000	£3,000	0
Depot maintenance per car per mile	£0.60	£0.70	£0.40
Fuel consumption per car per mile (litres)	0.8	0.75	0.5

== Operators ==
=== West Midlands Trains (London Northwestern Railway) ===
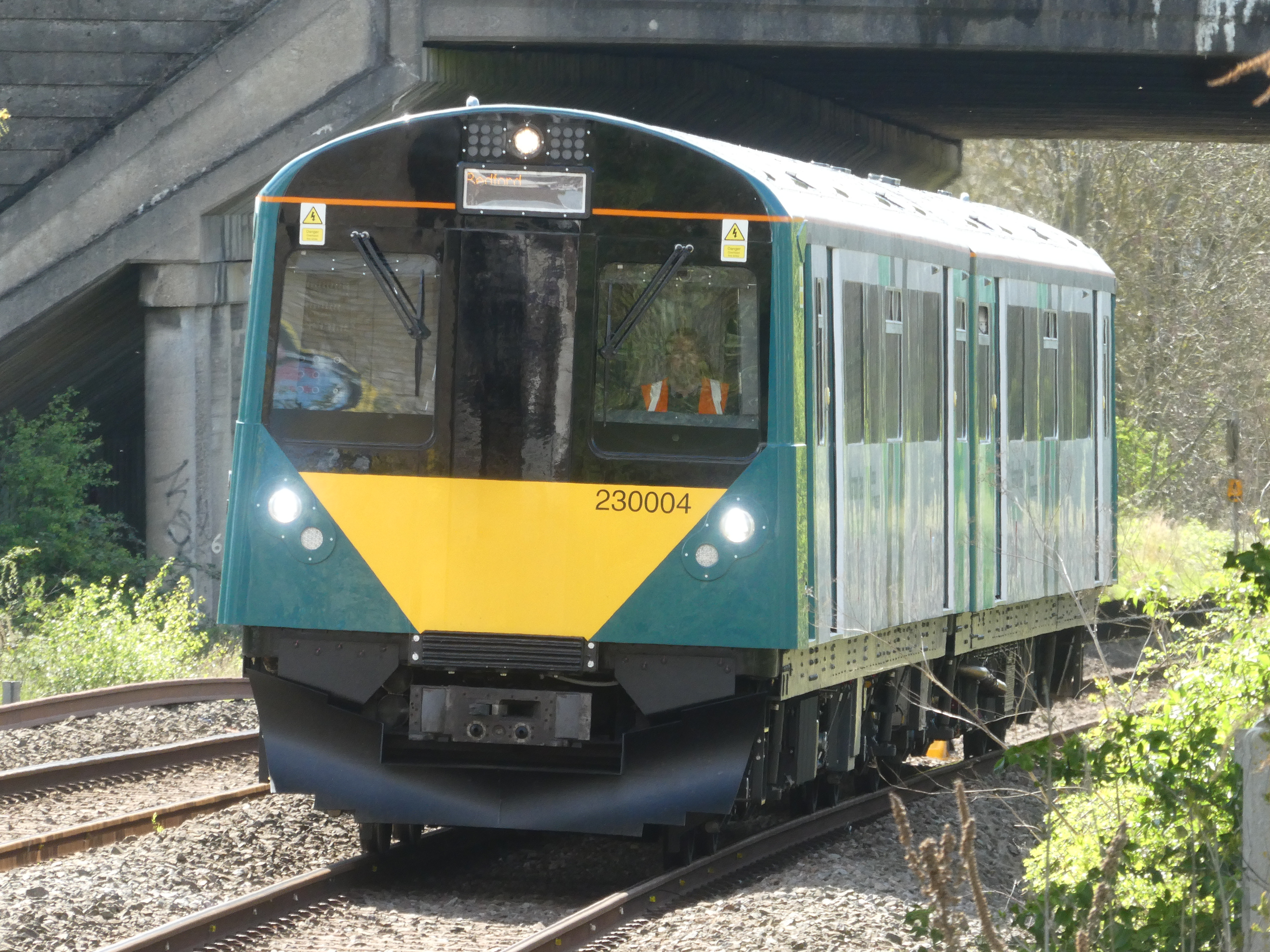
London Northwestern Railway Class 230 approaching Ridgmont in 2019

From December 2018, West Midlands Trains, also operating as London Northwestern Railway was intending to operate three Class 230 units on the Marston Vale Line, but their introduction was delayed, entering service on the Bletchley to Bedford line on 23 April 2019.

The cars in these sets have only two doors on each side.

On 1 December 2022, London Northwestern Railway announced that they had withdrawn their Class 230s from service between Bedford and Bletchley until further notice as a result of Vivarail – who maintained the Class 230 fleet for LNR – entering into administration. Replacement buses operated on the Marston Vale Line until Class 150s were introduced to restart services, replacing Class 230s.

=== Transport for Wales ===
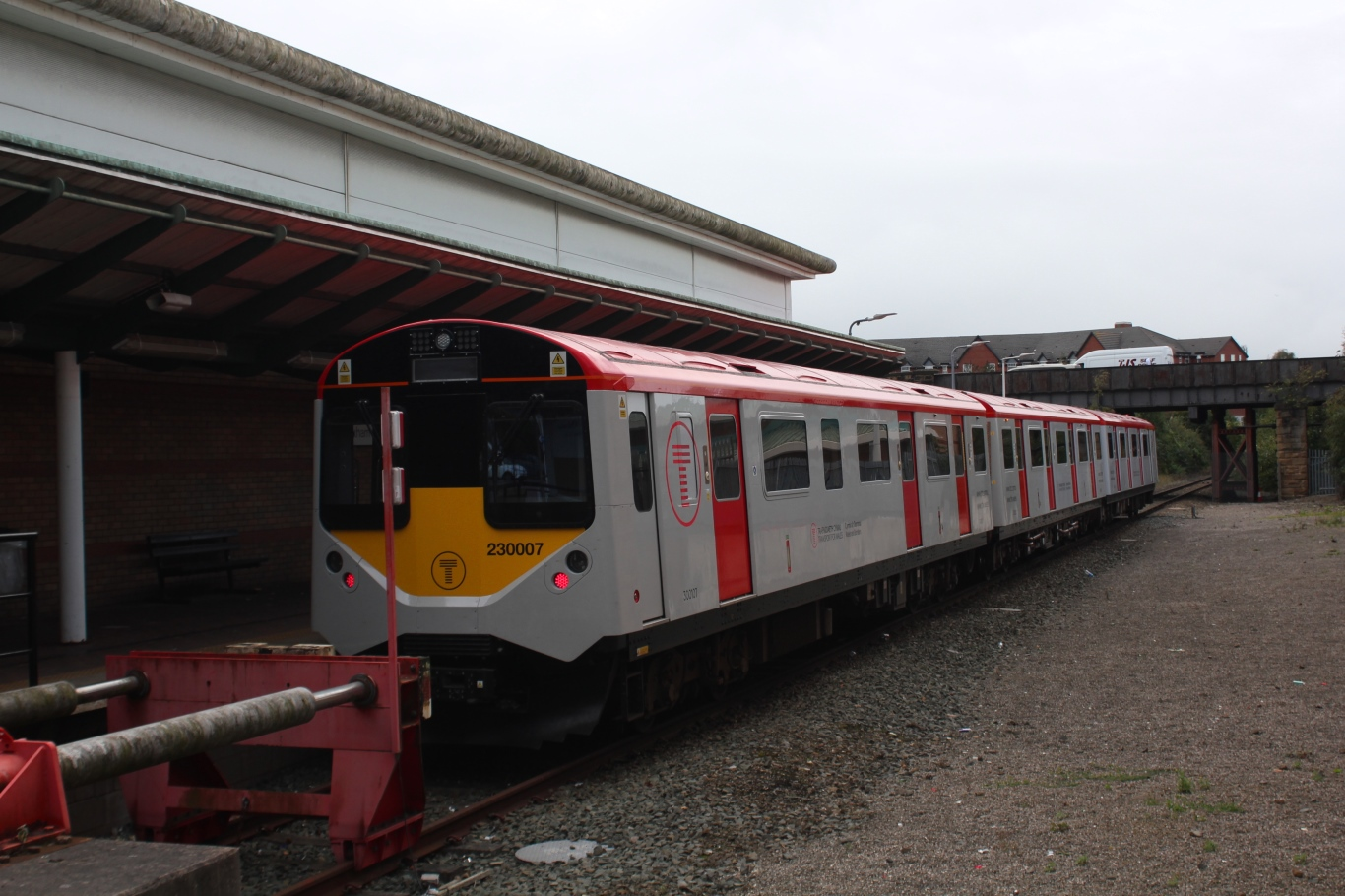
Transport for Wales 230007 at Wrexham Central in 2023

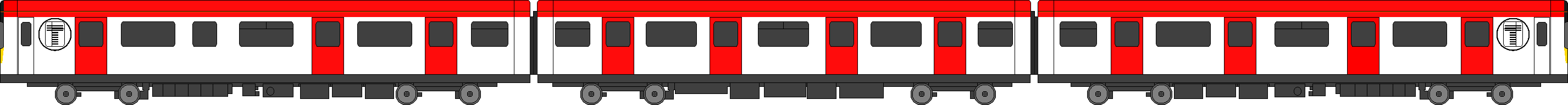
Class 230 Transport for Wales Diagram

Transport for Wales Rail was expected to operate five units on the Borderlands Line from May 2022.

Testing of the TfW units began in spring 2020 on the Kidderminster Line.

TfW sets have a restyled front end and retain the previous door spacing, except for the removal of one door on each side of one of the driving cars for the fitting of a universal accessible toilet, replaced by a blank panel on the toilet side and a window on the other.

Entry into service was delayed by a number of technical issues with the fleet and was then further complicated by Vivarail's going into administration on 1 December 2022.

The first Class 230 entered service on 3 April 2023 between Wrexham Central and Bidston.

=== Great Western Railway ===
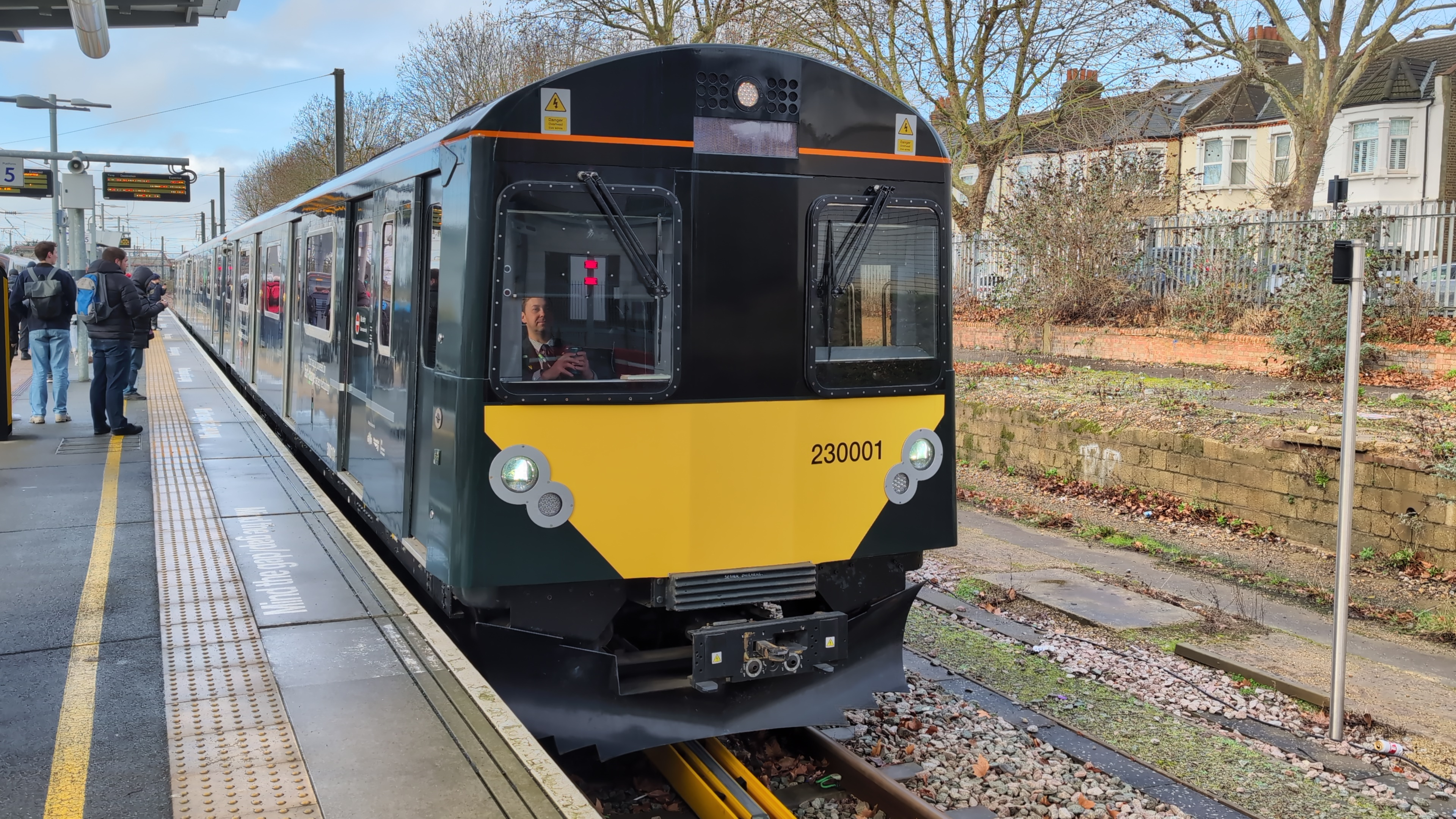
Great Western Railway 230001 at West Ealing in 2026

In February 2022, Great Western Railway announced plans to test fast-charge battery technology on the Greenford branch line. As it is a low priority to be electrified, the only realistic alternative option is to replace diesel powered rolling stock with battery powered rolling stock. The test will see the existing Class 165 units replaced by Class 230 battery-electric multiple unit trains produced by Vivarail, with the company's Fast Charge equipment installed. This will entail the installation of a conductor rail that becomes live only when a train is above it. This is then used to charge the lithium-ion batteries on the train, a process that would take about ten minutes. It was announced in February 2023 that GWR had purchased the relevant assets from the administrators of Vivarail, and taken over the employment of nine Vivarail staff, to allow this trial to proceed.

In August 2025, one of GWR's Class 230 units, 230001, broke the record for the longest railway journey on a single battery charge. The journey, a 200-mile return from Reading via Paddington and Oxford, broke the previous record of 139 miles held by Stadler Deutschland from 2021. Unit 230 001 began passenger operations on the Greenford branch line for the first time on 31 January 2026, and is used for passenger services on Saturdays, alongside the 165 DMUs.

== Incidents ==
On 30 December 2016, the prototype set caught fire at Kenilworth. Ten people were evacuated safely. It was announced in January 2017 that the planned trial on the Coventry to Nuneaton line had been cancelled. An incident report, produced by Vivarail, identified a fuel leak in one of the two new engine sets as the most likely cause of the fire.

== Fleet details ==
As of March 2017, two demonstrator units have been constructed. In October 2017, it was announced that West Midlands Trains had placed an order for three units. Initially intended to have a separate number sequence from the prototypes, the production units were eventually numbered sequentially.

Class	Operator	Qty.	Cars per unit	Year converted	Unit nos.	Type	Notes
230	Great Western Railway	1	3	2015	230001	BEMU	Fast-charging trial unit.
230	Great Western Railway	3	2	2018–2019	230003–230005	DEMU	London Northwestern Railway fleet, withdrawn from service indefinitely in December 2022. Now with Great Western Railway.
230	Vivarail	1	2	2018	230002	BEMU	"Pop-up metro" demonstrators in Pennsylvania.
230	Vivarail	1	2	2021–2022	230011	BEMU	"Pop-up metro" demonstrators in Pennsylvania.
230	Transport for Wales Rail	5	3	2020–2021	230006–230010	DBEMU	Entered service in April 2023.

=== Named units ===
Unit 230001 is named Viva Venturer.
