= Post Holdings =

American company

Post Holdings, Inc.
- Type: Public
- Traded as: NYSE: POST; S&P 400 component
- Industry: Consumer goods
- Founded: 2012; 14 years ago
- Headquarters: St Louis, Missouri, U.S.
- Area served: Worldwide
- Key people: William Stiritz (chairman); Rob Vitale (CEO)
- Products: Foods; dietary supplements; protein supplements; sports nutritions
- Revenue: ▲US$8.16 billion (2025)
- Operating income: ▲US$799 million (2025)
- Net income: ▼US$336 million (2025)
- Total assets: ▲US$13.5 billion (2025)
- Total equity: ▼US$3.76 billion (2025)
- Number of employees: 13,180 (2025)
- Subsidiaries: Post Consumer Brands; Michael Foods; Bob Evans Farms; Weetabix Limited; 8th Avenue; MOM Brands
- Website: www.postholdings.com
- Footnotes; Financials as of September 30, 2025.

Post Holdings, Inc. is an American consumer packaged goods holding company headquartered in St. Louis, Missouri, with businesses operating in the center-of-the-store, refrigerated, foodservice, and food ingredient categories.

Its Post Consumer Brands business manufactures, markets, and sells both branded and private label products, mainly breakfast cereals. Its Michael Foods Group business supplies value-added egg products and refrigerated potato products to the foodservice and food ingredient channels. Through its Post Refrigerated Retail business, Post offers potato, egg, sausage, and cheese refrigerated side dishes products. Post participates in the private brand food category through its investment in 8th Avenue Food & Provisions, a leading, private brand centric, consumer products holding company.

== History ==
=== Predecessor: Post Cereals Company ===
C. W. Post established his company, "Postum Cereals" in Battle Creek, Michigan, in 1895. Post's first product was not a cereal, however, but a roasted, cereal-based beverage, Postum.

Postum's main ingredients were naturally caffeine-free wheat grain, bran, and molasses. Initially, Postum had to be brewed like coffee, but in 1911, Post introduced a powdered, instant formulation. This version of the product was manufactured in Battle Creek until it was discontinued in 2007. As of January 2013, Eliza's Quest Food had succeeded in returning Postum to many grocery stores across the United States and Canada.

=== History of Post Holdings ===
On December 31, 2012, Post Holdings acquired Attune Foods, a marketer of premium organic cereals and snacks under the Attune, Uncle Sam and Erewhon brands.

On May 28, 2013, Post Holdings purchased the branded and private label cereal, granola and snacks business of Hearthside Food Solutions, which included the Golden Temple, Peace Cereal, Sweet Home Farm and Willamette Valley Granola Company brands, originally Yogi Bhajan's Sikh Dharma International's Golden Temple of Oregon's cereal division. Post combined this business with Attune Foods. On September 1, 2013, Post Holdings acquired Premier Nutrition Company, a marketer of premium protein shakes and bars under the Premier Protein brand and nutritional supplements under the Joint Juice brand.

On January 1, 2014, Post Holdings acquired private label pasta manufacturer Dakota Growers Pasta Company. On February 1, 2014, Post Holdings acquired Golden Boy Foods and Dymatize Enterprises. Golden Boy Foods is a manufacturer of private label peanut and other nut butters, as well as dried fruits and snacking nuts. Dymatize Enterprises is a manufacturer and marketer of premium protein powders, bars and nutritional supplements. In August 2014, Post Holdings acquired Honey Ohs! cereal from PepsiCo. On October 1, 2014, Post Holdings acquired PowerBar, Musashi and related worldwide assets from Nestlé. On June 2, 2014, Post Holdings acquired Michael Foods, a producer of value-added food products and service solutions to customers across the foodservice, retail and food ingredient channels including egg products, refrigerated potato products and cheese and other dairy case products through the Papetti's, AllWhites, Better‘n Eggs, Easy Eggs, Abbotsford Farms, Simply Potatoes and Crystal Farms brands. On November 1, 2014, Post Holdings acquired American Blanching Company, a manufacturer of private label peanut butter.

On May 4, 2015, Post Holdings purchased competitor MOM Brands, maker of the Malt-O-Meal line of cereals, for $1.15 billion ($1.05 billion cash and 2.5 million shares of Post Holdings stock). On October 5, 2015, Post Holdings acquired Willamette Egg Farms, a producer, processor and wholesale distributor of eggs and egg products. On July 3, 2017, Post Holdings acquired Weetabix Limited, UK based manufacturer of the Weetabix, Alpen and Ready Brek brands of breakfast cereals, from Bright Food and Baring Private Equity Asia for $1.4 billion.

On January 12, 2018, Post Holdings acquired Bob Evans Farms, a leading producer and distributor of refrigerated potato, pasta and vegetable-based side dishes, pork sausage, and a variety of refrigerated and frozen convenience food items under the Bob Evans Farms, Owens, Country Creek and Pineland Farms brands. On August 2, 2018, Post Holdings announced it formed 8th Avenue Food & Provisions, consisting of Post's private brands business, and entered into an agreement with Thomas H. Lee Partners, L.P., a private equity company, in which Post and THL together will separately capitalize 8th Avenue.

On October 17, 2019, Post Holdings brought its active nutrition business public – the business is now named BellRing Brands, Inc., which includes brands such as Premier Protein®, Dymatize® and PowerBar® and is traded under the symbol “BRBR” on the New York Stock Exchange. On July 1, 2020, Post acquired Henningsen Foods, a manufacturer of value-added egg, meat and poultry products. It was integrated into the Michael Foods foodservice business.

On December 8, 2020, Post announced that it was acquiring the Peter Pan peanut butter brand from Conagra Brands. The transaction was completed on January 25, 2021. With the acquisition of Peter Pan peanut butter on January 25, 2021, Post created a new group called Animated Brands, with the Peter Pan brand being the founding member. Animated Brands is managed under Post Consumer Brands by a separate management team and sales force. Animated Brands was chosen as the group name because it speaks to the intention to grow by adding other like-minded brands to this group – those that are energetic, action-oriented and have a spirit of growth aimed at driving strong business performance. On December 14, 2020, Post announced it will acquire Almark Foods, a leading provider of hard-cooked and deviled egg products. The transaction was completed on February 1, 2021.

On February 9, 2021, Post announced that one of its subsidiaries, Post Holdings Partnering Corporation (“PHPC”), a newly formed special purpose acquisition company, filed a registration statement on Form S-1 with the Securities and Exchange Commission (“SEC”) in connection with a proposed initial public offering. The proposed offering is subject to, among other things, completion of the SEC review and comment process. Post Holdings Partnering Corporation (PHPC) closed on May 28, 2021.

On March 29, 2021, Post, through its 8th Avenue Food & Provisions subsidiary, announced that it was acquiring Ronzoni from Ebro Foods' Riviana Foods subsidiary for $95 million. The acquisition is expected to be completed in the second quarter of 2021, pending regulatory approval. The transaction was completed on June 1, 2021.On May 28, 2021, Post acquired the Egg Beaters brand from Conagra Brands. The acquisition was completed on July 14, 2021. On June 1, 2021, Post announced it acquired the ready-to-eat ("RTE") cereal business of TreeHouse Foods.

On March 10, 2022, Post and BellRing Brands, Inc. (NYSE:BRBR) (“New BellRing”) announced the completion of the spin-off of 80.1% of Post’s interest in New BellRing to Post shareholders. On August 9, 2022, Post announced debt-for-equity exchange and offering of BellRing Brands Common Stock by selling stockholders. On November 25, 2022, Post divested remainder of Post's interest in BellRing Brands.

On January 13, 2023, after receiving a cease-and-desist letter from a band named OK Go, Post Consumer Brands filed for a declaratory judgement action in federal court requesting a judge find it can use the name OK GO! for a new on-the-go cereal product.

== Brands ==
=== Post Consumer Brands ===
- 9Lives
- Grape-Nuts
- Gravy Train
- Great Grains
- Honey Bunches of Oats
- Honeycomb
- Kibbles 'n Bits
- Pebbles
- Peter Pan peanut butter
- Premier Protein
- Raisin Bran
- Shredded Wheat
- Three Sisters Cereal Brands

==== Former MOM Brands ====
- Malt-O-Meal
- Marshmallow Mateys

Following Post Holdings' acquisition of the parent company in 2015, MOM Brands were merged with Post's existing cereal business and are now branded as Post Consumer Brands.

=== Weetabix brands ===
- Alpen
- Barbara's
- Ready Brek
- Weetabix
- Weetos
- UFIT High Protein Drinks

=== Michael Foods brands ===
- Abbotsford Farms – Foodservice
- BEF Foods
- Davidson's Safest Choice – Foodservice
- Michael Foods
- Papetti's HyGrade Egg Products
- Pineland Farm Potato Company – Foodservice
- Simply Potatoes – Foodservice

=== Post Refrigerated Retail brands ===
- Abbotsford Farms
- Better'n Eggs
- Bob Evans Farms
- Country Creek Farms
- Crystal Farms
- Davidson's Safest Choice
- Egg Beaters
- Owens
- Pineland Farms Potato Company
- Simply Potatoes

=== 8th Avenue Food & Provisions (private brands) ===
- Dakota Growers Pasta Company
- Golden Boy Foods
- Attune Foods brands
- American Blanching Company
- Ronzoni Pasta

=== Bright Future Foods ===
- Airly Foods
