= Weet-Bix =

High-fibre and low sugar breakfast cereal biscuit

- Logo used since 2023, currently used alongside the 1985 logo.

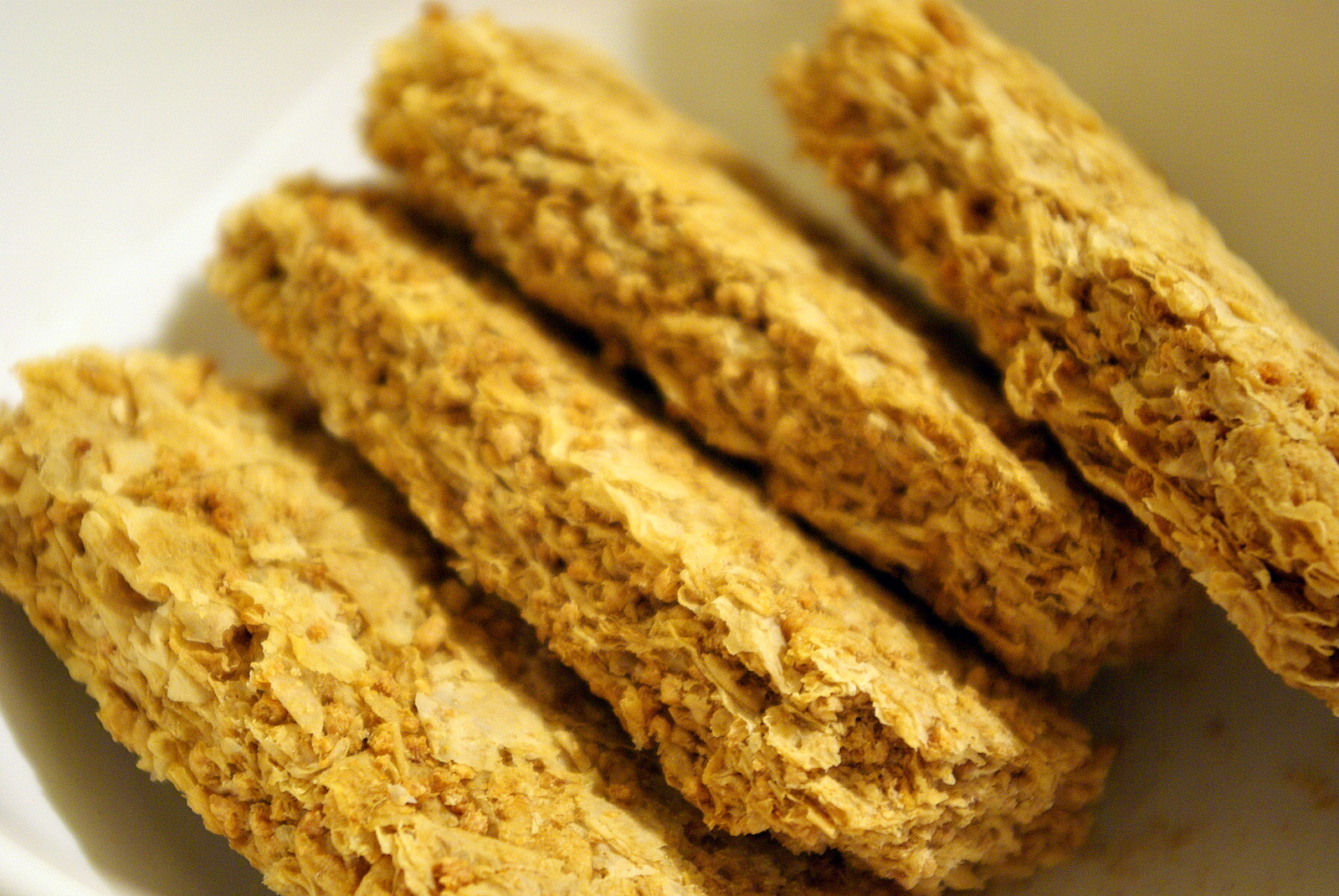
- A bowl of Weet-Bix
- Product type: Breakfast cereal
- Produced by: Sanitarium Health and Wellbeing Company (Australia and New Zealand); Bokomo (South Africa)
- Country: Australia and New Zealand
- Markets: Australia, New Zealand, South Africa
- Website: weetbix.com.au

Weet-Bix is a whole-grain wheat breakfast cereal created and manufactured in Australia and New Zealand by the Sanitarium Health Food Company, and in South Africa by Bokomo.

== History ==
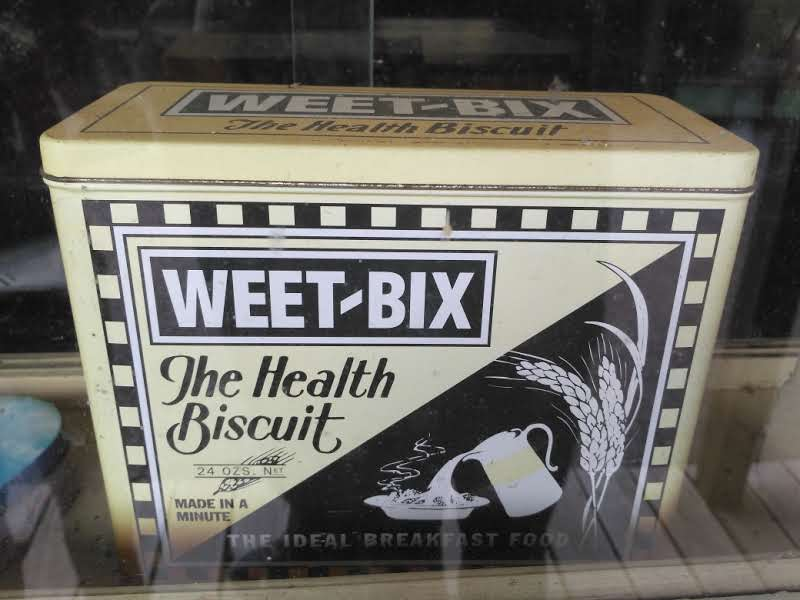
An early Weet-Bix tin from the 1930s

In the mid-1910s, Bennison Osborne set out to develop an improved version of Granose, a biscuit sold by the Seventh-day Adventist Church through the for-profit Sanitarium Health Food Company. On 19 August 1926, he applied for a trademark for his biscuit, having named it Weet-Bix.

Production began at 659 Parramatta Road, Leichhardt, under the management of Osborne, and with the financial backing of Arthur Shannon, who created the company Grain Products to manufacture the cereal. Malcolm Ian Macfarlane, a friend from New Zealand, helped to market it. In October 1928, Weet-Bix a success, Shannon sold the rights to Sanitarium, specifically Australasian Conference Association Limited.

Following this, Weet-Bix expanded internationally. Macfarlane suggested shipping boxes to New Zealand, a process which eventually became difficult. Osborne and Macfarlane created another company in the country, soon sold by Shannon to Sanitarium, and established factories in Auckland and Christchurch. A third company in South Africa, with Osborne managing sales, and a factory in Cape Town, was sold to Bokomo.

While in South Africa, Osborne and Macfarlane sought to obtain more satisfactory financial backing to secure Osborne's product. A group was formed, Osborne refined the product, and he and Macfarlane went to England to establish the product there.

Weet-Bix in a 1930s Sanitarium Health Foods window display in Ashburton, New Zealand

The British & African Cereal Company, Ltd. was registered in London in 1932, as a private company, with the proprietor shown as Weetabix Limited of Weetabix Mills, Kettering. All shares in the company were specified to be under the control of the directors, the first of whom were Osborne, Macfarlane, Alfred Richard Upton and Arthur Stanley Scrutton. For the purpose of legally differentiating the product from that sold in Australia, New Zealand and South Africa, the product was named Weetabix.

Osborne and Macfarlane became the joint managing directors with Osborne controlling production and Macfarlane controlling marketing. Sites for the factory were examined, with Burton Latimer in Northamptonshire eventually being chosen, due in part to the offer of a disused flour mill by a Mr. George, who requested shares in the company and who was subsequently offered a seat on the existing board of directors. In 1933, Macfarlane left the company to pursue other business interests, leaving Osborne as the sole managing director. George eventually became chairman of the board. Osborne sold his shareholding to the directors in July 1936, at which time the company was renamed Weetabix Limited.

At that time, Osborne established a Weetabix factory in the United States, in Clinton, Massachusetts. However, the venture was unsuccessful, and Weetabix eventually entered the US market from Canada via Clinton, the site of the original US factory.

Weet-Bix Clusters were discontinued in June 2025.

== Varieties ==
=== Gluten Free Weet-Bix ===
In July 2014, Sanitarium introduced gluten-free Weet-Bix, produced from sorghum grains. Earlier in 2014, the company had recommissioned their Perth-based Weet-Bix factory into a dedicated gluten-free manufacturing facility to produce this new product.

=== Weet-Bix Bites ===
Sanitarium introduced Weet-Bix Crunch in 2003 as a honey-flavoured, bite-sized version of their cereal.

The product was rebranded as Weet-Bix Bites in the late 2000s with additional flavours launched, some using infused fruit: Golden Crumble, Wild Berry, Apricot, and Coco Malt, alongside the original Crunchy Honey.

As of 2024, Weet-Bix Bites are available in four varieties: Apricot, Wild Berry, Honey Crunch, with a new Coco Crunch launched that July.

== Brand popularity ==
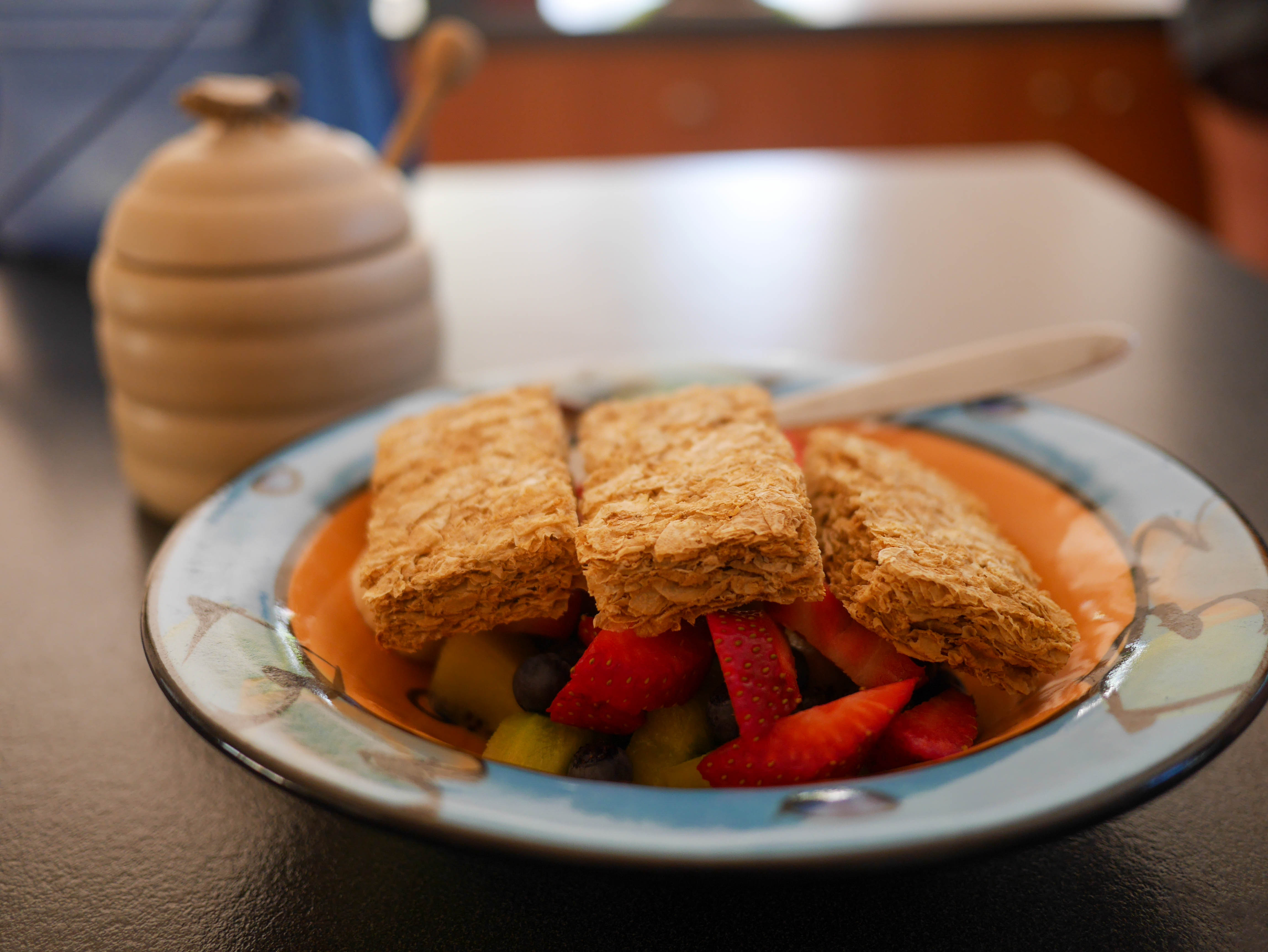
Weet-Bix served with fruit

Weet-Bix is seen in Australia, New Zealand, and South Africa as an iconic national foodstuff. An online poll of 16,000 people in 2006 identified it as Australia's favourite trademark. The product has been marketed in Australia since 1985 with the catchphrase "Aussie kids are Weet-Bix kids". Based on its success in Australia, a similar catchphrase was adopted six months later in New Zealand: "Kiwi Kids are Weet-Bix kids".

== Weet-Bix cards ==
Sanitarium started to issue collectors' cards in 1942 as a marketing device in their boxes of Weet-Bix and for some of their other breakfast cereal products, including Granose, Bixies, Cerix and later Puffed Wheat, Puffed Rice, Weeta Puffs, Weeta Flakes and Corn Flakes. Sanitarium have also issued cards in their New Zealand products, sometimes similar to the Australian series but also series with a New Zealand focus such as the All Blacks–themed "Stat Attack" cards.

== See also ==
- Weetabix – the UK variant that is now exported to around 80 countries.
- Shredded Wheat – another wheat-based biscuit cereal.
- Granola
