= Pioneer Foods =

South African food company

- Type: Subsidiary
- Industry: Food
- Founded: 1997; 29 years ago
- Headquarters: Bellville, City of Cape Town, South Africa
- Area served: Africa; United Kingdom
- Key people: TA Carstens (CEO); ZL Combi (Chairman)
- Brands: Bokomo; Sasko; Ceres Fruit Juices; Liqui-Fruit; Safari; White Star; Spekko
- Revenue: ▲ R18.74 billion (2015)
- Net income: ▲ R2.15 billion (2015)
- Parent: PepsiCo (since 2020)
- Website: pioneerfoods.co.za

Pioneer Foods is a major South African FMCG company, based in Cape Town. Founded in 1997, it has been a subsidiary of American firm PepsiCo since 2020. It operates in South Africa as well as two other African countries and exports a number of its brands globally.

The company's core business is the production, distribution, marketing and selling of a diverse range of food, beverages and related products. The group employs approximately 8600 permanent employees.

The Pioneer Foods brand portfolio includes Bokomo cereals, Liqui-Fruit, Ceres Fruit Juice, SASKO bread, Safari dried fruit & nuts, Spekko rice and White Star maize.

== History ==
Pioneer Foods was created following the merger of two South African packaged goods companies - (SASKO and Bokomo), in 1997. SASKO was renamed Essential Foods while Bokomo Foods and Ceres Beverages were consolidated into a single management structure as Groceries.

It was listed on the Johannesburg Stock Exchange ("JSE") in 2008 under the ticker PFG and delisted in 2020 following the acquisition by PepsiCo.

In 2010, Pioneer Foods was fined R195 million by the South African Competition Commission for colluding with other bread producers to raise the price of bread by between 30c and 35c per loaf in 2007. This fine reflected roughly 10% of Pioneer owned Sasko's 2006 turnover in bread sales.

According to the commission South Africa's four largest milling companies collectively controlling over 90 percent of the local flour market were involved in colluding with each other. The four firms (Premier Foods, Tiger Brands, Foodcorp, and Pioneer Foods) facilitated their pricing activities through secret meetings and telephone calls between employees of these firms at various venues, including churches, stadiums and hotels. The commission found that these price-fixing activities had a negative effect on both consumers as a whole as well as preventing smaller bakeries from being effective competitors.

Quantum Foods was unbundled from Pioneer Foods in October 2014 and is listed as a separate entity on the JSE.

In 2016, Pioneer gained a 49% stake in the cereal brand Weetabix in East Africa, which included a partnership with Weetabix UK.

A subsidiary of Pioneer Foods, Pioneer Foods UK, in December 2017 bought UK-based granola brand, Lizi's, from The GoodCarb Food Company for an undisclosed price. The purchase was reportedly in line with Pioneer Foods' strategic plan to acquire companies in geographies and categories where they have an existing presence.

In May 2018, Pioneer Foods received approval from the Competition Tribunal to buy the outstanding 50.1% of Heinz South Africa, that it didn't already own, on condition that the deal did not lead to significant job losses. The acquisition was effective 1 June 2018, and makes the Heinz SA operation a wholly owned subsidiary. This deal adds the well-known brands of Wellington's, Mama's Pies, Today, and John West to the Pioneer Foods basket of brands.

In March 2020, Pioneer Foods was acquired by American FMCG company PepsiCo for around R25 billion. This made it one of PepsiCo's largest deals outside of the US. As part of the acquisition's negotiations with the South African Government's Department of Trade and Industry (DTI), PepsiCo made commitments relating to jobs, investment, local empowerment, and procurement in SA, and agreed that its Sub-Saharan HQ would be located in South Africa. Pioneer Foods 10,000 employees were protected from merger-related retrenchments, employees could elect at least one board member of the new entity, and employees were issued with shares in PepsiCo worth R1.6 billion.
