= Lyons Tea (Ireland) =

Brand of tea sold in Ireland

- Founded: London, England as J. Lyons and Co.
- Products: Black Teas, Green Teas & Fruit and Herbal Teas
- Website: http://www.lyonstea.ie/

Lyons is a brand of tea belonging to LIPTON Teas and Infusions that is sold in Ireland. It is one of the two dominant tea brands in the Irish market, along with Barry's Tea.

== History ==
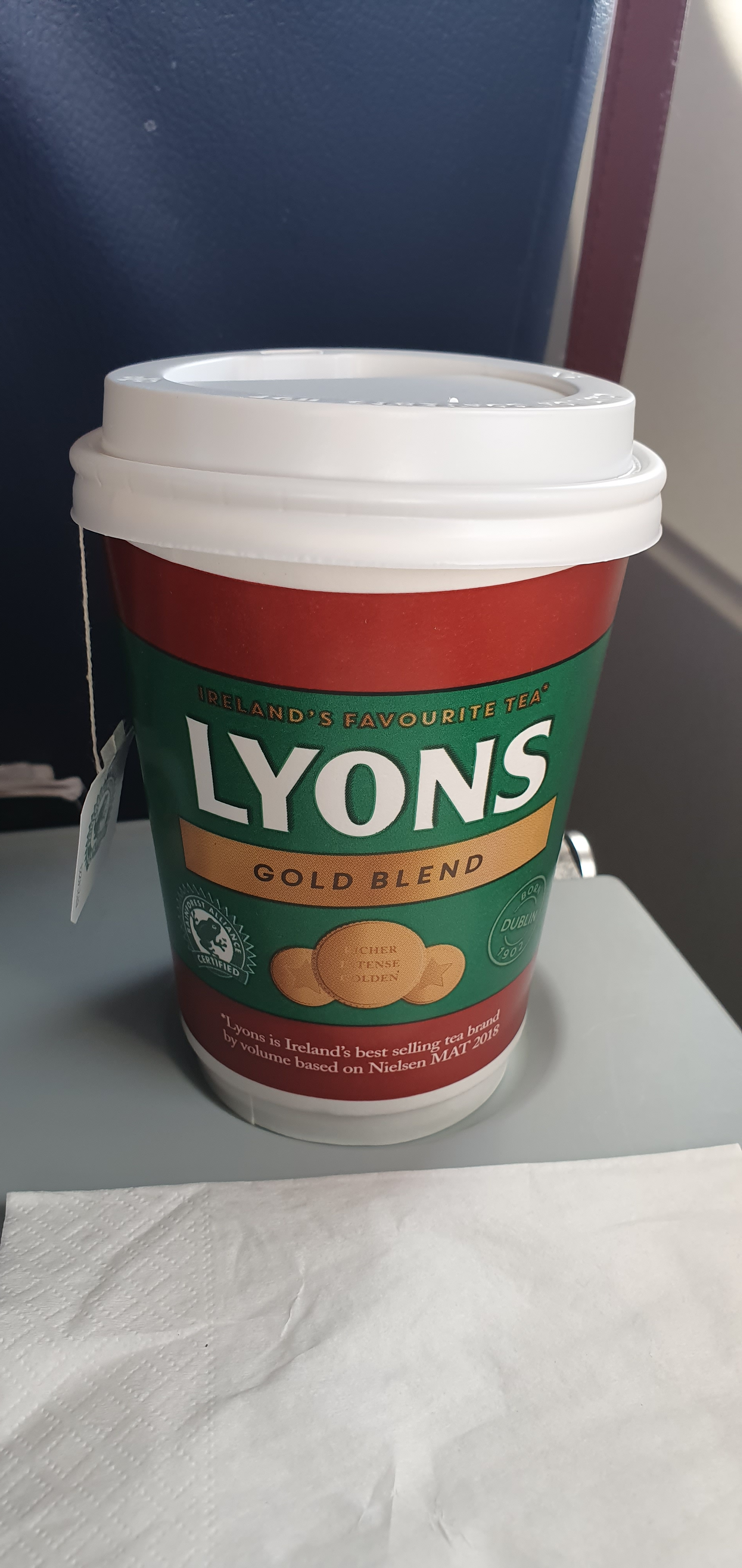
Lyons tea branding

Lyons Tea was first produced by J. Lyons and Co., a catering empire created and built by the Salmons and Glucksteins, a German-Jewish immigrant family based in London. Starting in 1904, J. Lyons began selling packaged tea through its network of teashops. Soon after, they began selling their own brand Lyons Tea through retailers in the UK, Ireland and around the world. In 1918, Lyons purchased Hornimans and in 1921 they moved their tea factory to J. Lyons and Co., Greenford at that time, the largest tea factory in Europe.

In 1962, J Lyons and Company (Ireland) became Lyons Irish Holdings. After a merger with Allied Breweries in 1978, Lyons Irish Holdings became part of Allied Lyons (later Allied Domecq) who then sold the company to Unilever in 1996. Today, Lyons Tea is produced in England. Lyons Tea was a major advertiser in the early decades of RTÉ Television, featuring the "Lyons minstrels" and coupon-based prize competitions.

The story of J Lyons is told in the book Legacy: One Family, a Cup of Tea and the Company that Took On the World by Thomas Harding.
