= Weetabix Limited =

British food company

- Type: Subsidiary
- Industry: Breakfast cereal
- Founded: 13 August 1932; 93 years ago
- Headquarters: Burton Latimer, Northamptonshire, England
- Area served: Europe, North America
- Key people: Colm O'Dwyer (Managing Director)
- Products: Weetabix; Alpen; Ready Brek; Weetos; Crunchy Bran; Puffins
- Number of employees: c. 2,000
- Parent: Post Holdings
- Website: weetabixfoodcompany.co.uk

Weetabix Limited, trading as the Weetabix Food Company, is a British food processing company that is responsible for the production of breakfast cereal brands, including Weetabix, Alpen, Crunchy Bran and Ready Brek. The company also produces Puffins cereal and Snackimals snacks through their Barbara's Bakery division.

== History ==
See History of Weet-Bix

The food product was originally invented in Australia in the 1920s by Bennison Osborne. Osborne and his friend Malcolm MacFarlane successfully launched Weet-Biscs in Australia and New Zealand under the sponsorship of the owner of Grain Products Ltd., who soon sold the Australasian rights to the Australasian Conference Association Limited Sanitarium Health and Wellbeing Company.

Osborne and MacFarlane decided to expand into South Africa and while there, they began the establishment of the British & African Cereal Company, Ltd., a Private Company, to start a venture in England under the Companies Act 1929 (Company No. 267687), where they became joint managing directors until MacFarlane left the Company in 1932/1933, after which Osborne became the sole managing director until 1936, when he left the Company for the United States. The first Directors of the company were Bennison Osborne, Malcolm MacFarlane, Alfred Richard Upton and Arthur Stanley Scrutton. Frank George, who had offered them the use of a disused flour mill in Burton Latimer, Northamptonshire, subsequently requested and was granted shares in the company and was offered a place on the Board.

The company held a royal warrant from Queen Elizabeth II. In January 2025, a new Royal Warrant was appointed by King Charles III.

For the purpose of differentiating between the various countries, it was decided that the product, when introduced into the United Kingdom, should be known as "Weetabix". On 13 August 1936, with the approval of the Board of Trade, the Company name was changed to Weetabix Limited.

Alpen was invented in 1971, when a company executive was on holiday in Switzerland and tasted a local delicacy.

In November 2003, the company was bought from Weetabix Limited, by the American private equity firm HM Capital of Dallas. From 29 January 2004, it was owned by Lion Capital LLP, until 3 May 2012 when the Chinese company Bright Food bought a 60% controlling stake, valuing the company at £1.2bn ($1.9bn).

In 2012 the company was bought by the Chinese Government through the state-run Bright Food, and the equity firm Baring Private Equity Asia, with Bright Food having the controlling interest.

In July 2017, the American company Post Holdings bought the company for £1.4 billion.

The company does not have the rights to the product in Australia, New Zealand or South Africa. In these countries, the brand is still known as Weet-Bix and is still made by Sanitarium Health Food Company in Australia and New Zealand and Bokomo in South Africa.

In 2019, Weetabix was fined £140,000 by the Environment Agency for leaking thousands of litres of diesel fuel into the River Ise. The clean-up cost the company £500,000.

In 2021, Weetabix faced strike action over a decision to make workers redundant and re-employ them on lower wages, a practice known as fire-and-rehire. Workers at two of the company's factories went on a four-day strike in November 2021 over wages and working conditions.

Several of Weetabix's PR campaigns have attracted attention online, sparking debates about the creation of a new county called 'Weetabixshire', and the "correct way to eat your bix" in 2023.

In April 2023, Weetabix announced that it had achieved its goal of 100% recyclable packaging two years ahead of schedule. According to the company, the move to all paper packaging would reduce its carbon footprint by 648.4 tons per year.

In December 2023, Weetabix acquired Deeside Cereals, based in North Wales, from Wholebake.

=== Awards ===
Weetabix has won three Queen's Awards for Export.

== Company structure ==
The company is headquartered in Burton Latimer, Kettering, Northamptonshire, England, and its 75-acre (30 ha) site is between two A14 junctions; with the A509 and the A6. It also has a factory in Ashton-under-Lyne.

Weetabix is also one of the major manufacturers of generic cereals for the major supermarkets.

Weetabix has factories in Europe, East Africa and North America. It is the largest producer of breakfast cereals in the UK. It exports to eighty countries. As of 2012 it employed around 2,000 people.

The company's managing director is Sally Abbott.

== Brands ==
- Alpen
- Barbara's Bakery: The California-based natural-foods company was purchased by Weetabix in 1986, eventually moving operations to Marlborough, Massachusetts. They are particularly well known for their Puffins Cereal line. In 2019–2020 the packaging for Barbara's Bakery cereals was revamped, and on the new packaging all references to "The Weetabix Company, Inc." have been replaced with references to "Three Sisters Cereal".
- Crunchy Bran
- GrainShop: Sold primarily in the North American market, the GrainShop brand has two cereals, High Fibre Crisp and Honey Almond Crunch. High Fibre Crisp is a blend of four grains, wheat and corn, bran and oats, while Honey Almond Crunch is a combination of crunchy oats, flakes, almonds and honey.
- Oatibix: Products in the Oatibix range are made from oats, as opposed to the company's preference to wheat-based food. The original Oatibix cereal is physically very similar to the company's flagship Weetabix; only made of whole grain oats. Oatibix Bitesize is a variant of Oatibix with smaller biscuits and is available as Oatibix Bitesize Sultana & Apple or Oatibix Bitesize Chocolate & Raisin in addition to the original flavour.
- Oatibix Flakes
- Ready Brek: an oat-based breakfast cereal that is intended to be served hot, and comes in three varieties; 'Original', 'Chocolate' and 'Seriously Oaty'. A butterscotch flavour was marketed during the 1970s.
- Perfect Self Raising Flour & Plain Flour in 1950's, as used in 'Recipes for PERFECT Cooking' by Helen Burke, 1954.
- Weetabix: a whole grain wheat breakfast cereal that comes in the form of palm-sized biscuits. It is Weetabix Food Company's flagship product, introduced in 1932 and is officially the top-selling breakfast cereal in the United Kingdom, accounting for 8% of the country's total cereal sales. The cereal, which is manufactured in facilities in Kettering, England and Canada, is exported to 80 countries and has annual sales worth over £95 million. Weetabix Bitesize is essentially a smaller "bite-sized" version of Weetabix that can be easily poured into a bowl, more like a traditional breakfast cereal. Weetabix Minis are sweeter variant of the Weetabix Bitesize, with various additions depending upon the variety; Chocolate Crisp, Banana Crisp, Fruit & Nut Crisp, and Honey & Nut Crisp.
- Weetaflakes
- Weetos

== Sponsorship ==
Weetabix was the title sponsor of the Women's British Open between 1987 and 2006. It has also previously sponsored Northamptonshire Police, providing a mobile police station in 2004. It was one of the sponsors of the World Cup in Argentina in 1978. Weetabix was the main sponsor of the first BMX World Championships held in the UK in 1986. These Championships were held at Slough in Berkshire.
