= Brek =

Brek may refer to:

- Brek Shea, American soccer player
- Ready Brek, an oat-based breakfast cereal
- Polar Boy (a.k.a. "Brek Bannin"), DC Comics character
