= Netherlands–South Africa relations =

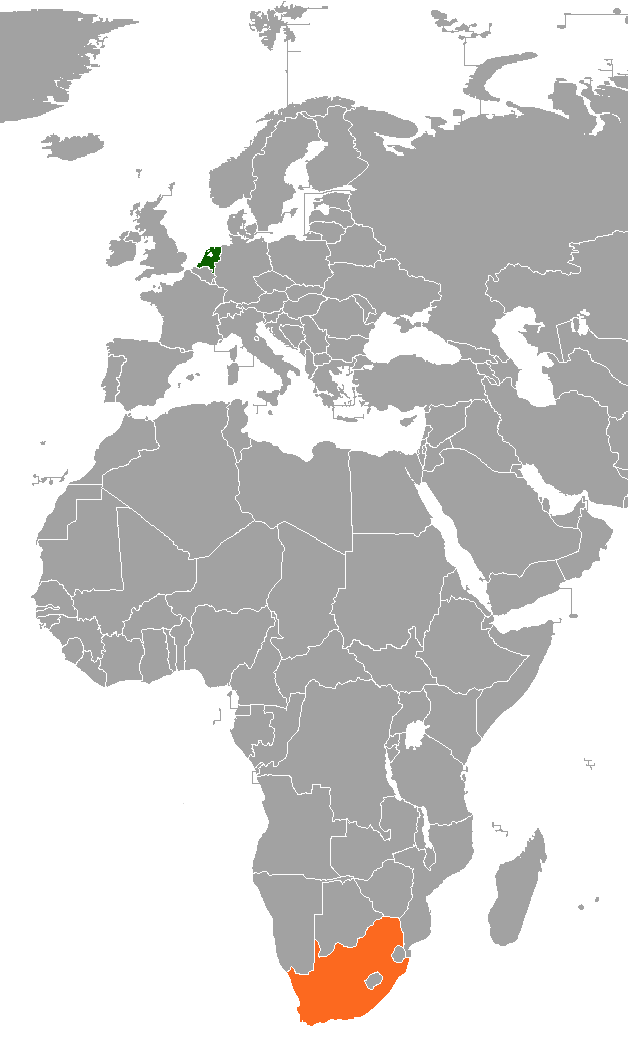
- Netherlands: South Africa

Netherlands–South Africa relations refers to the current and historical relations between the Netherlands and South Africa. Both nations share historic ties and have a long-standing special relationship, partly due to the Dutch colony in the Cape, linguistic similarity between Dutch and Afrikaans and the Netherlands' staunch support in the struggle against Apartheid until 1994.

== History ==
=== Colonial era ===
In 1652, the Dutch East India Company (VOC) established a refreshment station in present-day Cape Town to support ships navigating the long route to the Dutch East Indies (present-day Indonesia) including Batavia (present-day Jakarta), with the expansion of Dutch territorial interests led to initial hostilities with indigenous Khoikhoi communities led by the Dutch farmers and settlers ("Boers") expanded inland following these wars, becoming the forefathers of the Afrikaner population.

Britain invaded the Cape Colony in 1795 to prevent it from falling to French forces during the French Revolutionary Wars. After brief returns to the Dutch (beginning in 1803), the British secured permanent control in 1806 following the Battle of Blaauwberg, formalizing sovereignty in 1814. Following the defeat of Napoleon at Waterloo, the British exiled him to the remote South Atlantic island of Saint Helena in 1815, where he remained imprisoned until his death in 1821. The language of Afrikaans evolved locally from Dutch roots over centuries of cultural contact, after the British immigrated to South Africa which became settlers of 1820. Between 1860 and 1911, the British facilitated the arrival of Indian laborers, significantly altering South Africa’s demographics. Following the unification of Germany in 1871, the Scramble for Africa led Germany to establish a colony in present-day Namibia in 1884. German was the primary administrative and educational language there until the territory was invaded and occupied by South African forces (part of British Dominion) during the First World War in 1915, where it became a South African mandate until March 1990.

=== Relations during Apartheid ===
Flag of South Africa from 1928 to 1994 during the Apartheid (based on the Dutch tricolour of Prince's Flag)

In 1931, South Africa became independent after the passing of the Statute of Westminster. In 1938, the Netherlands and South Africa officially established diplomatic relations. During World War II (1939-1945) both nations fought as allies.

In 1948, the South African government, at the time representing only a small proportion of the population, erected a system of strict racial segregation and called it apartheid (separateness) which is a codified system of racial stratification which first began to take form in South Africa under the Dutch Empire in the late eighteenth century. Initially, the Dutch government was neutral to the apartheid government in South Africa. South Africa was one of only a handful of United Nations member states to support the Dutch view that the issues the Netherlands faced concerning the decolonization of Indonesia and the Netherlands New Guinea were of a 'domestic' nature and that the UN had no right to interfere. In 1949, during the visit of South African Prime Minister Daniel François Malan to the Netherlands, Dutch Queen Juliana told her guest that she would "never set foot in his country as long as apartheid reigned". In 1959 the Dutch representative to the UN abstained from voting for an anti-apartheid resolution, apartheid being regarded "an internal affair" of South Africa.

In March 1960, relations between the Netherlands and South Africa became tense after the Sharpeville massacre when South African police shot and killed 69 people. In 1961, the Netherlands was the only Western country to vote in favor of an anti-apartheid resolution in the UN. Soon, Dutch anti-apartheid movements called the "Anti-Apartheid Beweging Nederland" (AABN), and "Kommittee Zuidelijk Afrika" (KZA) (both later merged and converted themselves into the "Nederlands Instituut voor Zuidelijk Afrika" (NIZA)) began staging demonstrations and obtaining signatures to protest against the South African government in the Netherlands. Further events in South Africa led the Dutch government to take more drastic measures such as requesting that all Dutch companies stop dealing with South Africa (however, Shell continued to operate in South Africa). In 1983, the Dutch government imposed visa requirements to South African nationals visiting the Netherlands.

In February 1990, Nelson Mandela was released from prison after serving 27 years. In June 1990, Nelson Mandela paid his first visit to the Netherlands. In October 1990, South African President F. W. de Klerk paid a visit to the Netherlands. Apartheid legislation was abolished in mid-1991 and on 27 April 1994, South Africa held its first fully democratic election and Nelson Mandela was elected as President.

=== Current relations ===
In September 1996, Dutch Queen Beatrix paid an official visit to South Africa and met with President Mandela. In 1999, President Mandela paid an official visit to the Netherlands. Both nations maintain cordial relations and work together in international organizations and have signed numerous bilateral agreements in political, economic, cultural and social cooperation. There are direct flights between both nations via KLM.

== High-level visits ==
High-level visits from the Netherlands to South Africa

- Prime Minister Willem Drees (1953)
- Prince Bernhard of Lippe-Biesterfeld (1954)
- Queen Beatrix of the Netherlands (1996)
- Prime Minister Jan Peter Balkenende (2010)
- Crown Prince Willem-Alexander of the Netherlands (2010)
- Prime Minister Mark Rutte (2016)

High-level visits from South Africa to the Netherlands

- Prime Minister Jan Smuts (1946)
- Prime Minister Daniel François Malan (1949)
- President F. W. de Klerk (1990)
- President Nelson Mandela (1999)
- President Thabo Mbeki (2004)

== Trade ==
In 2016, trade between the Netherlands and South Africa totaled 2.9 billion Euros. Dutch exports to South Africa include: chemical based products, petroleum based products, machinery and gemstones. South African exports to the Netherlands include: livestock, meat, fish, fruit, juice and raw material. Dutch multinational companies such as Heineken International, Philips, and Royal Dutch Shell operate in South Africa. South African multinational company, Ceres Fruit Juices, operates in the Netherlands.

== Diplomatic missions ==
- Netherlands has an embassy in Pretoria and a consulate-general in Cape Town.
- South Africa has an embassy in The Hague.
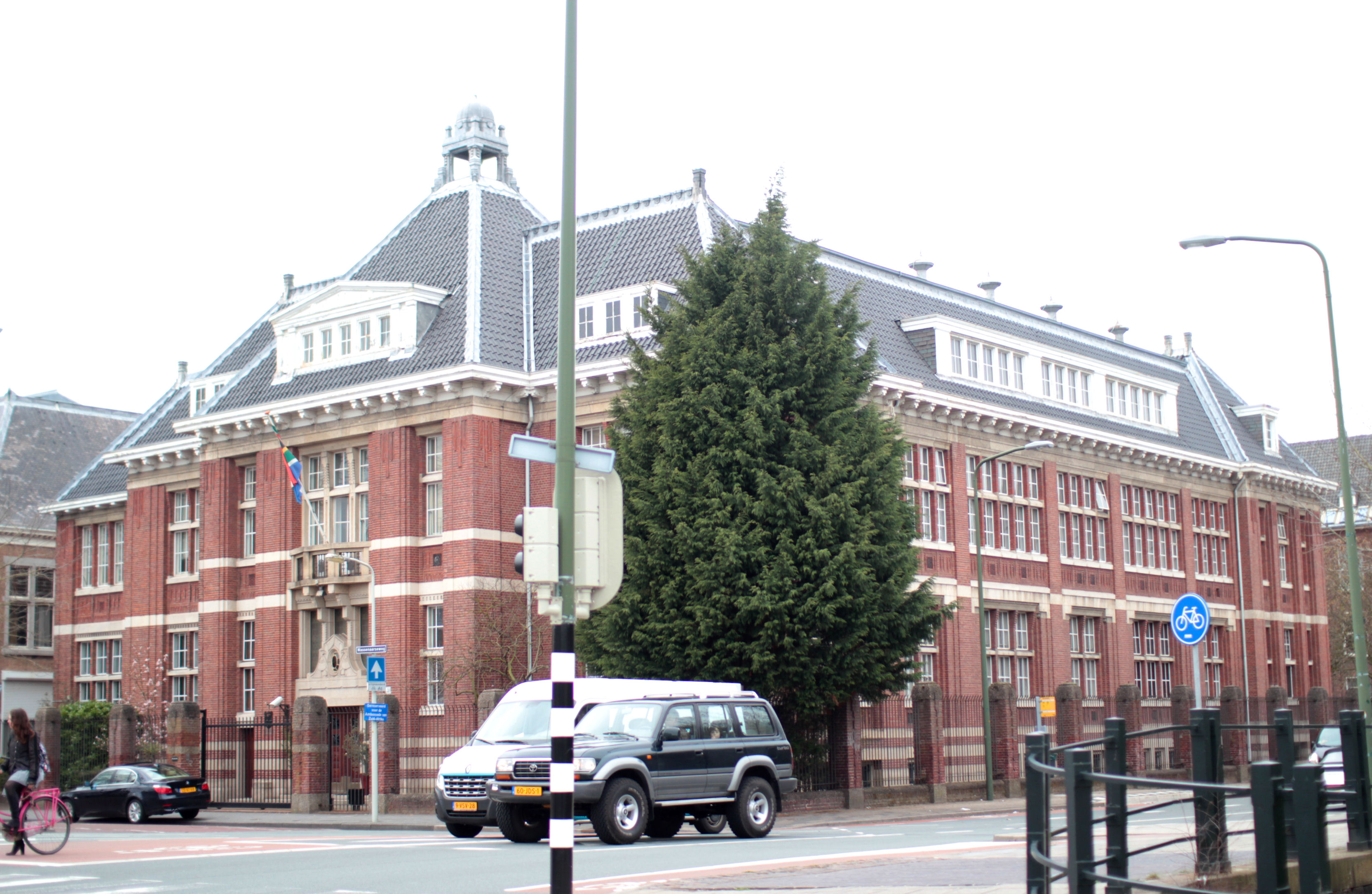
Embassy of South Africa in The Hague

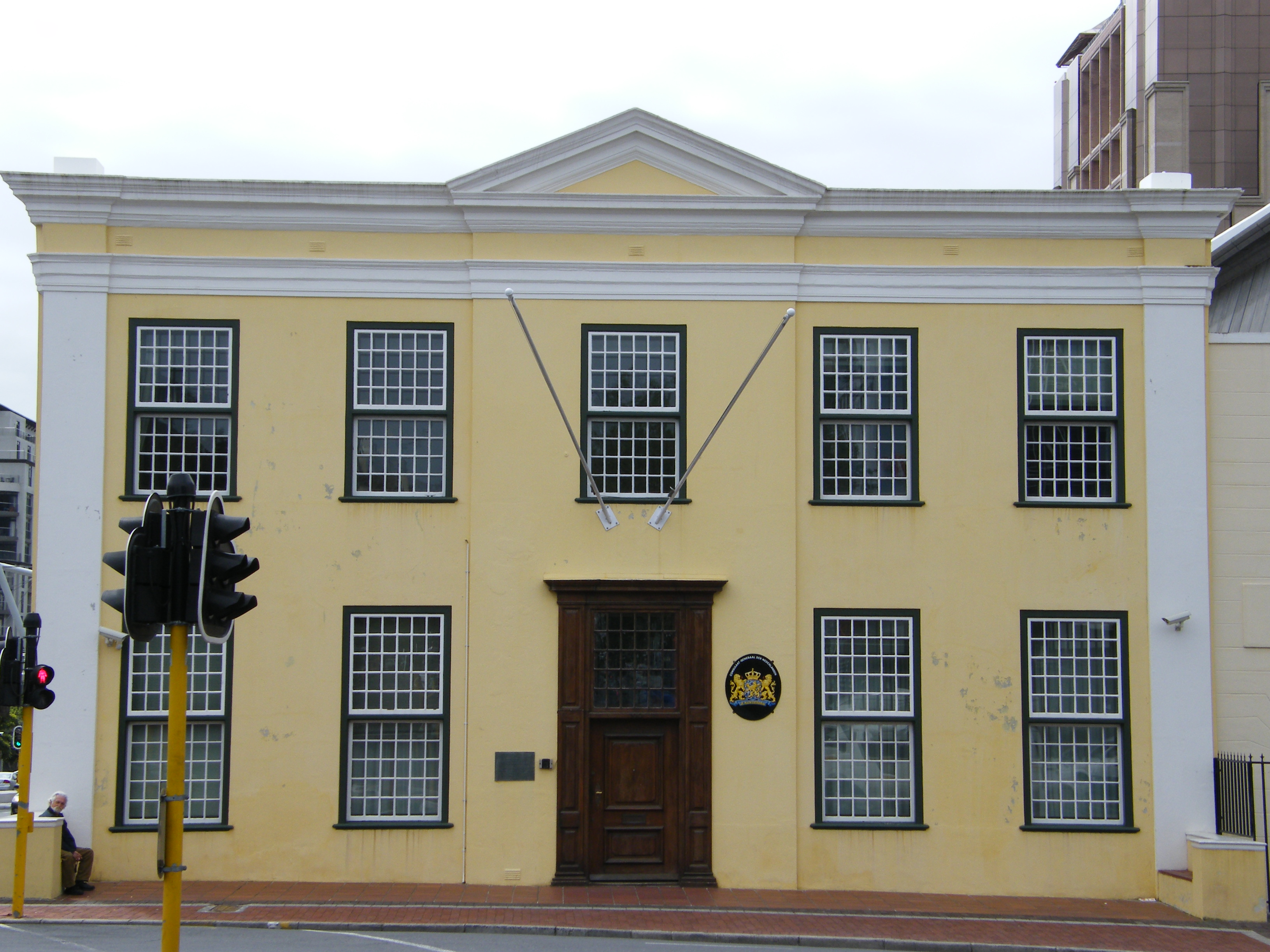
Consulate-General of the Netherlands in Cape Town

== See also ==
- Foreign relations of the Netherlands
- Foreign relations of South Africa
- Afrikaners
- Boer
- Cape Dutch
- Dutch Empire
- South Africa–European Union relations
