= Lyons Tea =

Lyons Tea may refer to:

- Lyons Tea (Ireland), brand of tea originating in Dublin and sold in Ireland
- J. Lyons and Co., British company known for its Lyons Tea Shops
