= Dreamfields =

Dreamfields may refer to:

- "Dreamfields" episode of Princess Gwenevere and the Jewel Riders
- Dreamfields brand of low-carb pasta
- The Dreamfields novel by K. W. Jeter
