= Edward Betham =

British scholar

Edward Betham (1709–1783) was an English scholar and divine. He was born at Silchester, Hampshire and was baptized there on 17 November 1709. His father, Robert Betham (d. 1719), who was rector of Silchester, was murdered when Betham was aged ten.

== Early life ==
He was educated at Eton College, and in 1728 proceeded to King's College, Cambridge. He became a fellow of King's College in 1731, and was also for some time bursar. He was subsequently presented by the provost and fellows to the living of Greenford, in Middlesex. He was appointed one of the preachers at Whitehall, and in 1771 the provost and fellows of Eton elected him to a vacant fellowship.

== Career ==
Betham appears to have impressed his contemporaries equally by his learning and his benevolence. 'His fortune was not large, yet his liberality kept more than equal pace with it, and pointed out objects to which it was impossible for his nature to resist lending his assistance.'

In 1780 Betham founded and endowed a charity school in his own parish of Greenford, having previously erected a schoolhouse there. The schoolhouse known as Betham House, which is now a residential property, at 168 Oldfield Lane, still bears a Latin inscription alluding to his generosity towards his parish. He gave 2,000l. for the better maintaining of the botanical garden at Cambridge. His affection for Eton was strikingly manifested in his will. He directed a marble statue of Henry VI to be prepared and erected at a cost of 700l.

The statue was entrusted to the well-known sculptor Bacon, and it now stands in the chapel of Eton College, bearing the inscription : 'Posuit Edvardus Betham, collegii hujusce socius.' The king holds a model of the college in his hand. A bust of Henry was also given to the college library by Betham, and other benefactions are associated with his name. Betham died in 1783 and buried in the grounds of the Holy Cross Church where he had been the Rector.

== Legacy ==
The Edward Betham Church of England Primary School, in Oldfield Lane South, Greenford, Middlesex continues his legacy. Notable alumni include England footballer, Bukayo Saka and Nigerian jazz musician, Camilla George.
