= Airly Foods =

Brand of snack cracker

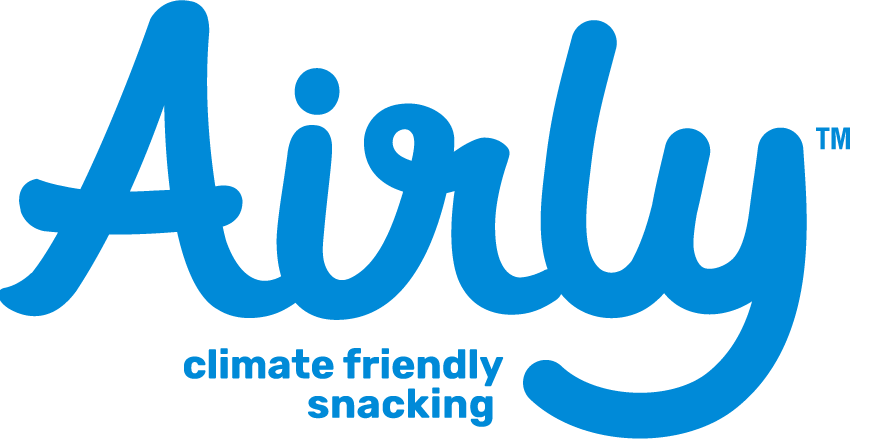
- Product type: Crackers
- Produced by: Post Holdings
- Country: St. Louis, Missouri, United States
- Introduced: 2022; 4 years ago
- Tagline: "Climate Friendly Snacking"
- Website: airlyfoods.com

Airly Foods is an American brand of snack crackers. The brand revolves around utilizing sustainable farming and carbon credits to offset the total carbon emissions which would result from traditionally producing such a product. Consequently, the crackers are produced in the shape of clouds.

The company follows three basic principles to ensure the positive environmental impacts of their crackers' production: no tilling of the soil, using prescriptive amounts of seed and fertilizer, ending over-fertilization, and planting legumes in fields between growing seasons for cash crops.

== History ==
In 2021, Post Holdings CEO Rob Vitale responded to changes in consumer patterns by telling two employees, Jennifer McKnight and Mark Izzo, to "find [him] something that has the potential to disrupt food and beverage." They responded by forming Bright Future Foods, a subsidiary with the goal of focusing on climate-friendly snacking options.

McKnight and Izzo formulated the idea for Airly Foods, a brand of crackers in which each box sold removed between eighteen and twenty-one grams of carbon dioxide from the air. Soon, a third co-founder, Kris Corbin, became involved with the brand.

The crackers went into production in 2022. Originally, four flavors were available: cheddar, chocolate, sea salt, and salted caramel. In January 2023, two more flavors became available: butter and cinnamon. Originally, they were sold only in specialty grocery stores, before hitting shelves in major supermarkets such as Walmart and Target.

== See also ==
- List of crackers
- Post Holdings
