= J. Lyons and Co., Greenford =

Food manufacturer in London, England

J. Lyons and Co., Greenford was a major food production factory located in Greenford, west London. Developed post World War I by J. Lyons and Co., it covered 63 acres (25 ha) at its height, and produced tea, coffee, grocery products and Lyons Maid ice cream. Ready Brek instant porridge breakfast cereal was developed at the site. In 1978, Lyons was acquired by Allied Breweries and became part of the resulting Allied Lyons, and as the focus of the new Allied Domecq business to focus on spirits, with the sell off of the businesses associated with the factory, the need for the facility dwindled. Redeveloped from 1998, today it is known as Lyon Way Industrial Estate.

== Background ==
In 1899, the fledgling J. Lyons company had purchased property near Cadby Hall at No. 62 Hammersmith Road. They subsequently bought Cadby Hall complex itself and retained the name, although the official address of the Cadby Hall complex became 66 Hammersmith Road. In time it became one of the largest food factories in the United Kingdom, growing to cover an area of more than 13 acres (53,000 m^{2}).

However, developing a site in a fast expanding inner city meant compromise, together with large amounts of food-related diversification, resulted in stunted growth for the company in its fast growing cakes business due to the space limitations at Cadby Hall. Post World War I, the company wished to expand its cakes business on site, but concluded that to do so it needed to find a secondary site close by that would allow sufficient capacity to both house the tea and coffee business, as well as allow for potential expansion of cake production.

== Transport ==
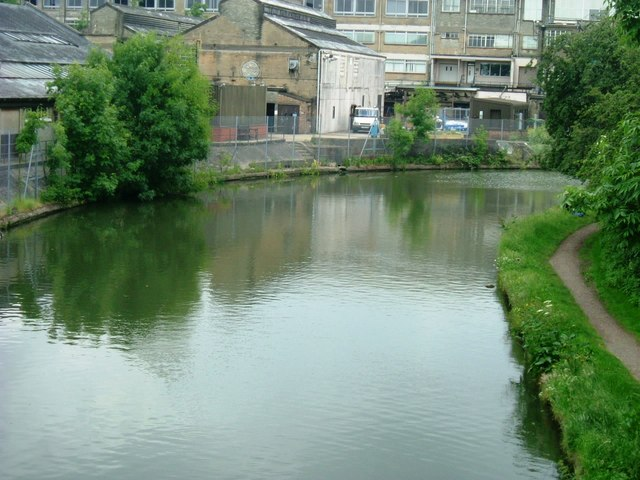
A modern view of the Grand Union Canal through Greenford, with the former Glaxo factory in the background (demolished 2018)

Transport was essential for a now international foods business, both for shipping goods in and distributing product outwards. Post the war, industry had been developing along the Grand Union Canal, north-westward from Brentford Dock to the then village of Greenford Green in Middlesex. The authorities had noticed this development, and had chosen to start development of the Western Avenue and the A4 Great West Road, both of which improved communications of the village to Central London.

In 1919, Lyons bought a site which straddled the Grand Union Canal, connecting it directly to the tea warehouses of London Docks and the River Thames. Further, they signed a development and shipping agreement with the Great Western Railway. Accessed via the Greenford Branch Line, which had access to the Great Western Main Line directly via West Ealing or over the New North Main Line via Old Oak Common junction, The New North Main Line also gave access to Birmingham and the Midlands via the Chiltern Main Line, or the West Coast Main Line via Willesden Junction. Finally, the London Underground system was being pushed westwards, and had reached Acton by 1923.

== Production ==
The factory officially opened in July 1921, with the first single-storey buildings known as "Zig-Zag" due to their northern light aligned windows allowing maximum light into the production area. There were steam and electrical power plants on site, which powered both the plant as well as the staff canteen and medical facilities, accessible to all plant employees and their dependents.

Transport docks and a canal basin had been developed, allowing shipment of tea and coffee directly from the London Docks into HM Customs excise controlled bonded warehouses. The extensive onsite railway infrastructure allowed precise positioning of heavy raw goods into the factory, as well as the extraction of finished product. Lyons bought their own steam shunters to move wagons between the GWR exchange sidings and the factory system.

Lyons, a later pioneer in electronic machines and computing, deployed the latest factory automation technology, making Greenford a showplace that was regularly visited by the media, academics, competitors and royalty, with more than one visit by King George V and Queen Mary.

Areas of the site not initially developed for factory use were landscaped, with many trees planted. As the factory developed these diminished, particularly after the development of the Bridge Park factory in the 1950s, and the new administration block in 1971.

=== Tea ===
Tea was shipped directly from London docks to the bonded warehouses, where quality was checked by an onsite laboratory. Blending then took place in a dedicated and decorated blending hall. This enabled Lyons by the end of 1921 to match tea sales of the pre-War period, assisted by the acquisition of Horniman's Tea in 1918 which could now be fully integrated. By the late 1920s the Greenford factory handled over 446 long tons (453,000 kg) of tea per week, distributing to over 200,000 outlets throughout the country by road and rail.

The tea production facilities were developed post World War 2, with the introduction of tea bags. As loose leaf tea became less popular, the balance of production facilities changed to reflect changed consumer buying patterns. To cope with this expansion, and increasing profits from the now wholly owned subsidiary tea division, in 1968 a new tea warehouse and distribution centre was built on residual land adjoining the Bridge Park ice cream factory. On hygiene production grounds, there were no connecting passages between the two facilities, except via the main entrances on Oldfield Lane North. Lyons Teabag production (mainly Quickbrew Tea) was moved to the Tetley tea plant in Eaglescliff, Teesside. Loose leaf (packet tea) production remained along with tea blending development.

=== Coffee ===
Incoming infrastructure for coffee was similar to that designed and used for tea production, but separated to avoid cross-contamination. There was a separate coffee blending hall, and an additional liquid facility was constructed. The production lines eventually gained a freeze drying line to produce instant coffee products.

=== Lyons Maid ice cream ===
Lyons had purchased a site north of the Grand Union to its existing facility for expansion in the 1930s, but had not used it pre-World War II. During the war, while parts of the factory were turned over to war time production, the land to the north was used for battery hen egg production. In 1954, development of a new ice cream factory was completed, known as the Bridge Park factory. This meant that regular milk trains now entered the factory transport network. Sold under the Lyons Maid brand, the factory was continually expanded as the company battled Unilever's Wall's Ice Cream brand.

=== Grocery lines ===
Greenford also produced all of Lyons grocery lines, including: tomato sauce; salad cream; jellies; custard powder and mixes. Lyons chocolate was produced at the site, but only as an over-flow facility from Cadby Hall. Many grocery lines were phased out during and post World War 2, but new lines were also continually introduced.

This included Ready Brek, created from experimentation by Walter Pitts, factory manager from the Tea division. Launched in 1957 as an instant porridge, and then in 1969 as an instant hot cereal. The brand was purchased by Weetabix in June 1990.

Corporate Offices

The office block at 325 Oldfield Lane was built in 1980 following the purchase of J Lyons by Allied Breweries forming Allied Lyons. The offices served as the headquarters for the tea and coffee business within Allied Lyons. In July 1995 The Tetley Group was formed following a management buy out (headed by Leon Allen - former Del Monte CEO, along with institutional investors including Prudential and Schroder) and the offices remained as global headquarters for the company. In 2000 the Tetley Tea business Including Lyons Teas) was sold and became a wholly owned subsidiary of Tata Consumer Products and the offices remain as the global headquarters for the subsidiary.

== Redevelopment: Lyon Way Industrial Estate ==
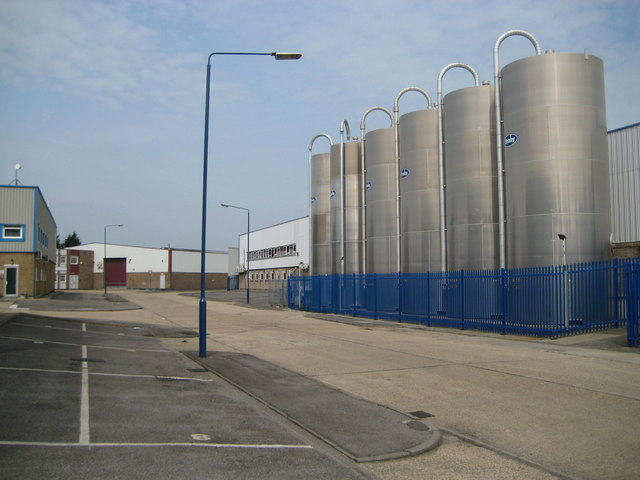
Silos on the Lyon Way industrial estate

From the 1960s, the business was losing money, but still controlled by the founding Salmon family. Lyons began to consolidate, selling and eventually closing down its tea shops, and selling its stake in the jointly owned LEO computer business with English Electric.

In 1978, Lyons was acquired by Allied Breweries and became part of the resulting Allied Lyons. The new business decided to focus on the production of alcohol and spirits, renaming itself Allied Domecq, and so began to dispose of the now non-core food production brands and facilities.

Greenford being an integrated food production facility was an obvious casualty of the asset sell-off. In 1992, the Lyons Maid business was sold to Nestlé, and the cakes business to Rank Hovis McDougall, integrated to their Manor Bakeries subsidiary which also makes Mr Kipling's Cakes. In 1995 the tea business was sold in a venture capital-backed Management buyout, under the terms of which the Greenford site was to be vacated.

In 1997, Allied Domecq arranged the phased disposal of the Greenford site from 1998. By 2002 the project was completed, and the site renamed Lyon Way Industrial Estate.
