= Weetos =

Breakfast cereal made by Weetabix

- Product type: Breakfast cereal
- Current owner: Weetabix
- Country: United Kingdom
- Related brands: Weetabix
- Markets: United Kingdom; Republic of Ireland; Scandinavia; France
- Website: https://www.weetabixfoodcompany.co.uk/our-brands/weetos

Weetos is a brand of chocolate-flavoured breakfast cereal produced by Weetabix Food Company. The name comes from the fact that its primary ingredient is wheat (Weet-) and the cereal pieces are in O shapes (-Os), the same naming convention that is used on the company's flagship cereal Weetabix (Wheat Biscuits).

The brand initially began with the Weetos cereal, officially known as Weetos Chocolate Flavour, and has expanded to include Weetos Meteors, Weetos Bars (which are cereal snacks in bar-form), and Weetos vs. Alien Invaders.

== History ==
Weetos has been marketed primarily toward children and younger consumers by the Weetabix Food Company and, as a result, has a long history with mascots. The original mascot, introduced in 1987, was a skateboarder named Derek, who "found life really boring, until new Weetos came out of the blue!", delivered in a broad West Midlands accent. From 1992, the breakfast mascot was Professor Weeto, an elderly gentleman dressed in a white labcoat, whose remaining hair was white and who wore a pair of spectacles constructed from two large Weetos pieces. He was the mascot that acted as the creator and sole advertiser for the cereal. In 2010, he was replaced by The Weeto, a strong Weeto with arms and legs who'd do anything to get into the cereal for children.

In 2006, Weetabix Food Company lowered the amount of sugar present in Weetos by over 35% as part of a drive to appeal to health conscious parents, which resulted in a change of flavour. This was coupled with the dropping of long-running mascot Professor Weeto in favour of neutral images of children participating in various sports.

== Products ==
Weetos Chocolate Flavour
Nutritional value per 100 g (3.5 oz)
- Energy: 1,594 kJ (381 kcal)
- Carbohydrates: 74.7g
- Sugars: 23.5g
- Dietary fibre: 6.2g
- Fat: 4.9g
- Saturated: 1g
- Protein: 8.4g
Vitamins and minerals
Vitamins	Quantity %DV^{†}
Thiamine (B1)	100% 1.2 mg
Riboflavin (B2)	108% 1.4 mg
Niacin (B3)	96% 15.3 mg
Pantothenic acid (B5)	102% 5.1 mg
Vitamin B6	100% 1.7 mg
Folate (B9)	43% 170 μg
Vitamin B12	38% 0.9 μg
Minerals	Quantity %DV^{†}
Iron	66% 11.9 mg
Sodium	4% 90 mg
- Serving size 30g
- ^{†}Percentages estimated using US recommendations for adults.

=== Weetos Chocolate Flavour ===
Weetos is packaged in a brown rectangular cardboard box with the logo and an advert of whatever toy is inside.

Ingredients include wholegrain wheat (41%), wheat flour, sugars, cocoa powder, vegetable oil, milk powder and various vitamins and minerals.

=== Weetos Meteors ===
Launched in 2008, Weetos Meteors is a space-themed cereal that combines the original O-shape pieces with star and meteor shapes ones. It is one of the few breakfast cereals that directly advertises to children seeing as it is not high in fat, salt and sugar (HFSS) and as a result, doesn't qualify for Ofcom's ban on promotional tie-ups with HFSS food products.

=== Weetos vs. Alien Invaders ===
Launched in 2011, Weetos vs. Alien Invaders contains both the original O-shaped pieces along with three ringed alien pieces.

=== Weetos Bar ===
Weetos is also available in a 20g cereal bar. They contain chocolate flavour wheat hoops and form a soft and chewy bar, with a layer of milk chocolate on the bottom, and are individually wrapped.

== See also ==
- Weetabix
- Weetabix Food Company
