= Sanitarium Health and Wellbeing Company =

Business enterprise owned by the Seventh-day Adventist Church

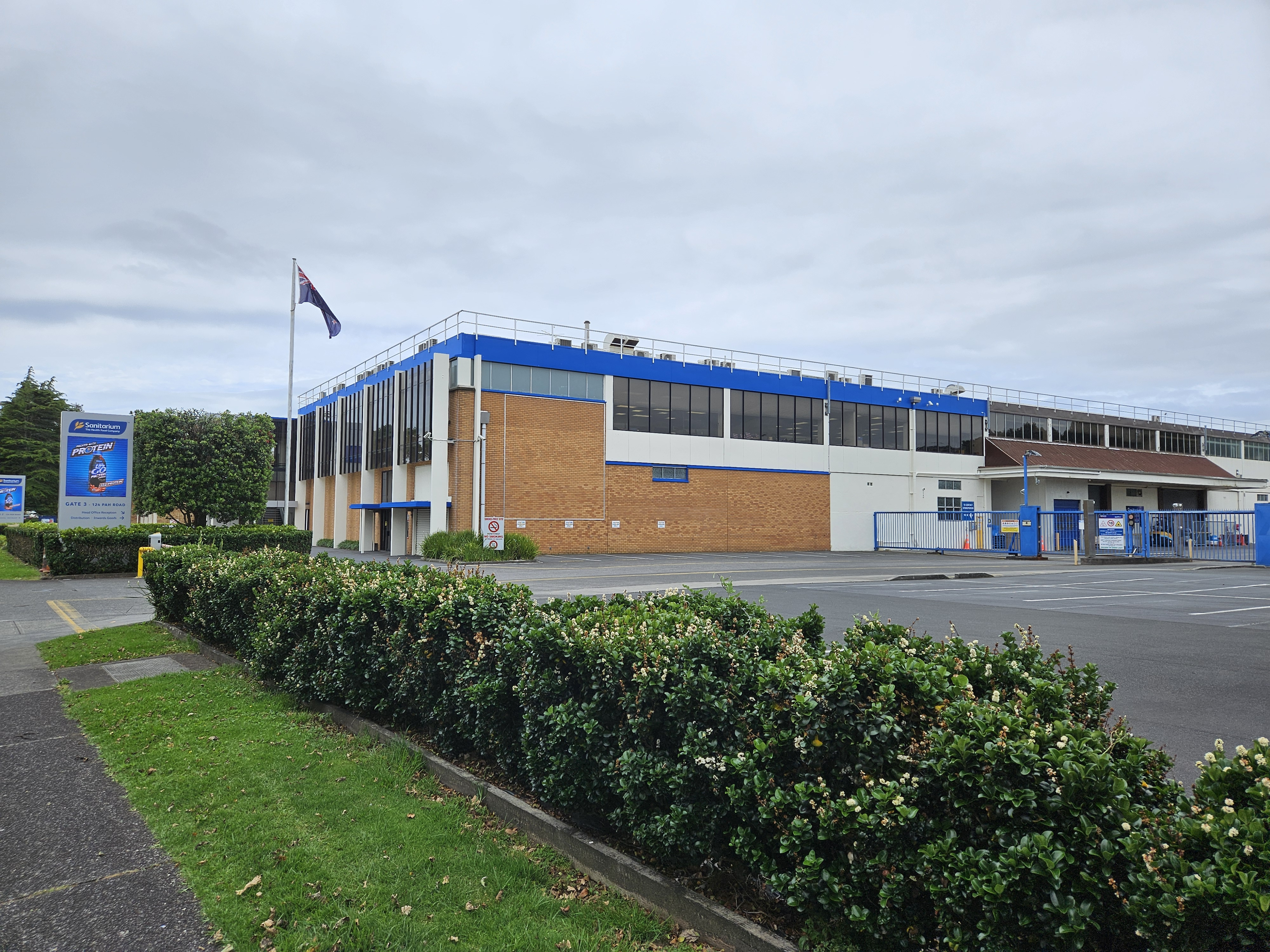
- Sanitarium New Zealand Head Office in Royal Oak, Auckland, 2023
- Type: Private
- Industry: Food
- Founded: 1898; 128 years ago, in Melbourne, Victoria
- Headquarters: Berkeley Vale, New South Wales, Australia; Auckland, New Zealand
- Key people: Kevin Jackson (CEO); Todd Saunders (Executive GM Australia NZ); Michael Barton (GM-New Zealand)
- Products: Weet-Bix; Up & Go; Peanut butter So Good; Marmite; Alternative Dairy Company
- Revenue: A$300 million
- Number of employees: 1700
- Parent: South Pacific Division of Seventh-day Adventists
- Website: Sanitarium Australia; Sanitarium New Zealand

The Sanitarium Health and Wellbeing Company is the trade name of two sister food companies (Australian Health and Nutrition Association Ltd and New Zealand Health Association Ltd). Both are wholly owned by the Seventh-day Adventist Church.

Founded in Melbourne, Victoria, in 1898, Sanitarium has factories in Australia and New Zealand, producing a large range of breakfast cereals and vegetarian products. All the food products it manufactures and markets are plant derived or vegetarian. Its flagship product is Weet-Bix sold in Australia and New Zealand.

== History ==
During his time in Australia in the 1890s, William C. White convinced Seventh-day Adventist Edward Halsey, a baker at John Harvey Kellogg's Battle Creek Sanitarium, to emigrate to Australia. Halsey arrived in Sydney, New South Wales, on 8 November 1897. He rented a small bakery in Melbourne, and produced granola (made of wheat, oats, maize, and rye) and Granose (the unsweetened forerunner to Weet-Bix). Halsey and his team sold it from door to door as an alternative to the fat-laden and nutrient-poor foods popular at the time. In 1900, Halsey transferred to New Zealand, where he began making the first batches of Granola, New Zealand's first breakfast cereal, Caramel Cereals (a coffee substitute), and wholemeal bread in a small wooden shed in the Christchurch suburb of Papanui.

Sanitarium New Zealand and Sanitarium Australia are separate companies that work together.

=== Factories ===
The initial Melbourne factory relocated to larger premises in Cooranbong, New South Wales, next to the campus of the seminary which became Avondale University College.

Sanitarium has factories in several locations, including Berkeley Vale in New South Wales; Carmel in Perth, Western Australia; Brisbane, Queensland; and Auckland, New Zealand. Weet-Bix was originally manufactured, from 1928, at 659 Parramatta Road, Leichhardt, where until recent times Sanitarium signage could still be seen. This factory predates the purchase of Weet-Bix by Sanitarium in 1930. A factory was operating in Palmerston North in New Zealand, but closed in the late 1990s. The Hackney factory in Adelaide, South Australia was closed in October 2010, followed by the Cooranbong factory in 2018.

==== Warburton ====
Sanitarium Health Food and Signs Publishing Company buildings
- Location of the factory in Victoria

General information
- Status: Completed
- Type: Factories
- Architectural style: Modernist
- Location: 51 Main Street, Warburton, Yarra Ranges, Melbourne, Victoria, Australia
- Coordinates: 37°45′09″S 145°41′57″E
- Completed: 1938; 88 years ago

Design and construction
- Architect: Edward F. Billson
- Main contractor: TR & L Cockram Pty Ltd
- Awards: Royal Victorian Institute of Architects Street Architecture Award (1940)

Victorian Heritage Register
- Official name: Sanitarium Health Food and Signs Publishing Company buildings
- Type: Registered place
- Designated: 19 February 1986
- Reference no.: H0619
- Heritage overlay no.: HO7
- Category: Commercial

The Sanitarium Health Food and Signs Publishing Company buildings are two heritage-listed factories located at 51 Main Street in Warburton, in the Yarra Ranges, in the north eastern suburbs of Melbourne, in Victoria, Australia. The two buildings, although largely performing different functions, comprise an integrated industrial complex. Built between 1936 and 1938 on the traditional lands of the Wurundjeri people, the adjacent factories replaced an earlier building that was completed in 1925 to manufacture Granose. The 1925 factory was damaged by floods in 1934 and the two factories were constructed and operational by 1938, that produced Granose and later Weet-Bix until 1997. The "Signs of the Times" factory produced packaging for health food products in addition to church publications.

The 1930s buildings were added to the Victorian Heritage Register on 19 February 1986 in recognition of their historical and architectural significance; and was also added to non-statutory list by the Victorian branch of the National Trust on 3 October 1985.

The 1930s factories were unusual because it had an on-site hydro-electricity plant which also supplied the township of Warburton. Designed by Edward Billson in the Modernist style, Billson was the first student to graduate in architecture from The University of Melbourne, in 1914 and was articled to Walter Burley Griffin. Billson's design was influenced by the contemporary European models. In particular they draw heavily on the personal style of Dutch architect W. M. Dudok which had in turn developed through the influence of the De Stijl movement and the work of Walter Gropius. The main contractor was TR & L Cockram Pty Ltd, a long established and eminent family firm of master builders who constructed many significant 19th and 20th century buildings throughout Victoria. The buildings and their rural setting reflects the health and fitness philosophy of the Seventh Day Adventist Church providing an insight into the historical importance of the church's missionary work and its role in the development of the Australian health food industry.

=== New Zealand import controversy ===
In June 2017, Sanitarium caused controversy when it objected to a specialty shop-owner based in Christchurch, New Zealand, trying to import 300 boxes of Weetabix into the country. New Zealand Customs detained the boxes at the request of Sanitarium on the grounds the British-made Weetabix competed with and confused the branding of their own New Zealand-made 'Weet-bix'. Sanitarium faced a backlash in New Zealand as a result. After failing to come to a settlement, Sanitarium filed civil action against the shop owner. The case hearing began in the High Court at Christchurch on 30 July 2018. Weetabix is also sold as "Whole Wheat Biscuits" in Australia (as international food).

== Tax exemption ==
Neither the Australia nor the New Zealand Sanitarium companies pay company tax on their profits, due to their ownership by a religious organisation. On their official website, Sanitarium defend their tax exemption with several points, stating they operate exclusively for charitable purposes, and that income tax exemptions are available to all companies and individuals in New Zealand who limit themselves to charitable purposes. However, the exemption has been criticised and is considered unfair by their competitors.

According to their last annual return as of February 2019, businesses operated by the Seventh-day Adventist Church reported more than $10 million profit.

== Products ==
=== Honey Puffs ===
Honey Puffs were a wheat breakfast cereal coated with honey made in Australia and New Zealand that was discontinued in June 2025.

=== Marmite ===
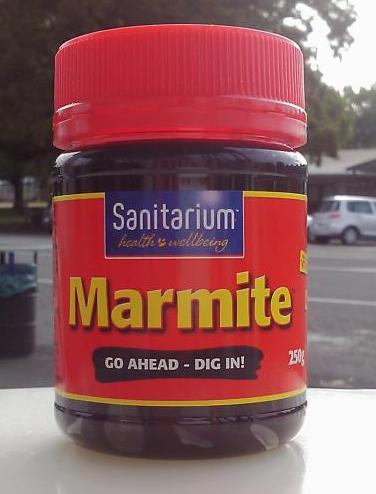
A jar of Marmite

Marmite is a food spread made in New Zealand. It is made from yeast extract, by-product of beer brewing.

=== So Good (soy beverage) ===
So Good (also known as SoGood or So-Good) is a brand of non-dairy beverages, foods, and desserts that are lactose, cholesterol and gluten-free. So Good is manufactured by Sanitarium Health and Wellbeing Company in Australia and New Zealand. In Canada, it was prepared by Earth's Own. So Good is sold in India by Life Health Foods.

In Australia, So Good produces soy milk, as well as almond milk and almond and coconut milk. They also produce flavoured soy milk and frozen soy desserts.

In India, So Good produces almond milk and almond and coconut milk, in addition to soy milk. They also produce flavoured soy milk, flavoured almond milk, fortified soy milk, and variants of oat milk.

=== Up & Go ===
Up & Go is the brand of a range of liquid breakfast products manufactured and marketed by Sanitarium Health and Wellbeing Company. The brand was the first product that established the category of liquid breakfast in supermarket and convenience stores in Australia and New Zealand. Many other brands have entered the category since the late 1990s, and forced the brand to defend its market share.

In June 2013, Choice magazine released a study of 23 liquid breakfast products questioning the validity of claims that were made by manufacturers including Up & Go claims regarding fibre content. Sanitarium defended Up & Go in a release citing the current code of practice for nutrient claims that a product must contain a minimum of 3 g of dietary fibre per serving to be considered "high in fiber" and Up & Go contained 3.8 g of fibre per 250-ml serving.

=== Weet-Bix ===
Weet-Bix is a wheat breakfast cereal made in Australia and New Zealand and in South Africa by Bokomo.

== See also ==
- List of manufacturing plants in Melbourne
- List of places on the Victorian Heritage Register in the Shire of Yarra Ranges
