= Peter Pan (peanut butter) =

Brand of peanut butter

- Product type: Peanut butter
- Current owner: Post Holdings
- Produced by: Post Consumer Brands
- Country: United States
- Introduced: 1928; 98 years ago
- Previous owners: Conagra Brands (1988–2021); Beatrice/Hunt–Wesson (1984–1988); Swift & Company (1928–1984)
- Website: www.peterpanpb.com

Peter Pan is an American brand of peanut butter that is marketed by Post Consumer Brands, part of Post Holdings. Named after the J. M. Barrie character, the product was introduced by Swift & Company through its Derby Foods subsidiary, E.K. Pond Company. It was renamed "Peter Pan" in 1928. Plastic jars were introduced in 1988 for product sold in the United States.

== History ==
1944 newspaper ad for the product.

Peter Pan’s origins date to 1915, when Derby Foods manufactured peanut butter under the name of its subsidiary, the E.K. Pond Company. Edmund Kirk Pond was the company’s namesake, and the cousin of Henry Clay Derby, whose Derby Foods was the parent entity.

Edmund Pond died in 1900, and Henry Derby sold the enterprise to Swift & Company in 1904. E.K. Pond Company also marketed its peanut butter under its "Yankee" and "Toyland" brands, but without much success. Meanwhile, in 1921, Joseph L. Rosefield patented a nonseparating, partially hydrogenated peanut oil peanut butter. In 1923, he licensed his patent to Derby Foods, which initially marketed the product under the name “Dainty” or “Delicia." It did not sell well. The greatest boost to sales came when, in 1928, Derby Foods seized upon the popularity of the James M. Barrie play by appropriating the title character for its brand name. Peter Pan Peanut Butter became a best seller.

Originally packaged in a tin can with a turn key and reclosable lid, the product's packaging was changed to glass jars because of metal shortages during World War II. In 1988, Peter Pan was the first brand of peanut butter to be sold in plastic jars.

The product was the main ingredient in Frankford Candy & Chocolate Company's now-discontinued product, Peter Pan Peanut Butter Cups.

On December 8, 2020, Conagra announced that it would sell the Peter Pan brand to Post Holdings. The transaction was completed on January 25, 2021.

== Promotion ==
Past spokesmen for Peter Pan have included actor Sterling Holloway, actor Mark Linn-Baker, comedian Alan Sues, and game show host Art James.

In earlier versions of the product, Peter Pan was clearly pictured as a woman in a Peter Pan costume, rather than as a boy.

== Varieties ==
Peter Pan Peanut Butter is currently sold in 10 varieties: Creamy Original, Crunchy Original, Creamy Whipped, Creamy Honey Roast, Crunchy Honey Roast, Natural Creamy, Natural Creamy Honey Roast, Original Almond Butter, Vanilla Roast Almond Butter, and Honey Roast Almond Butter.

== Recall ==
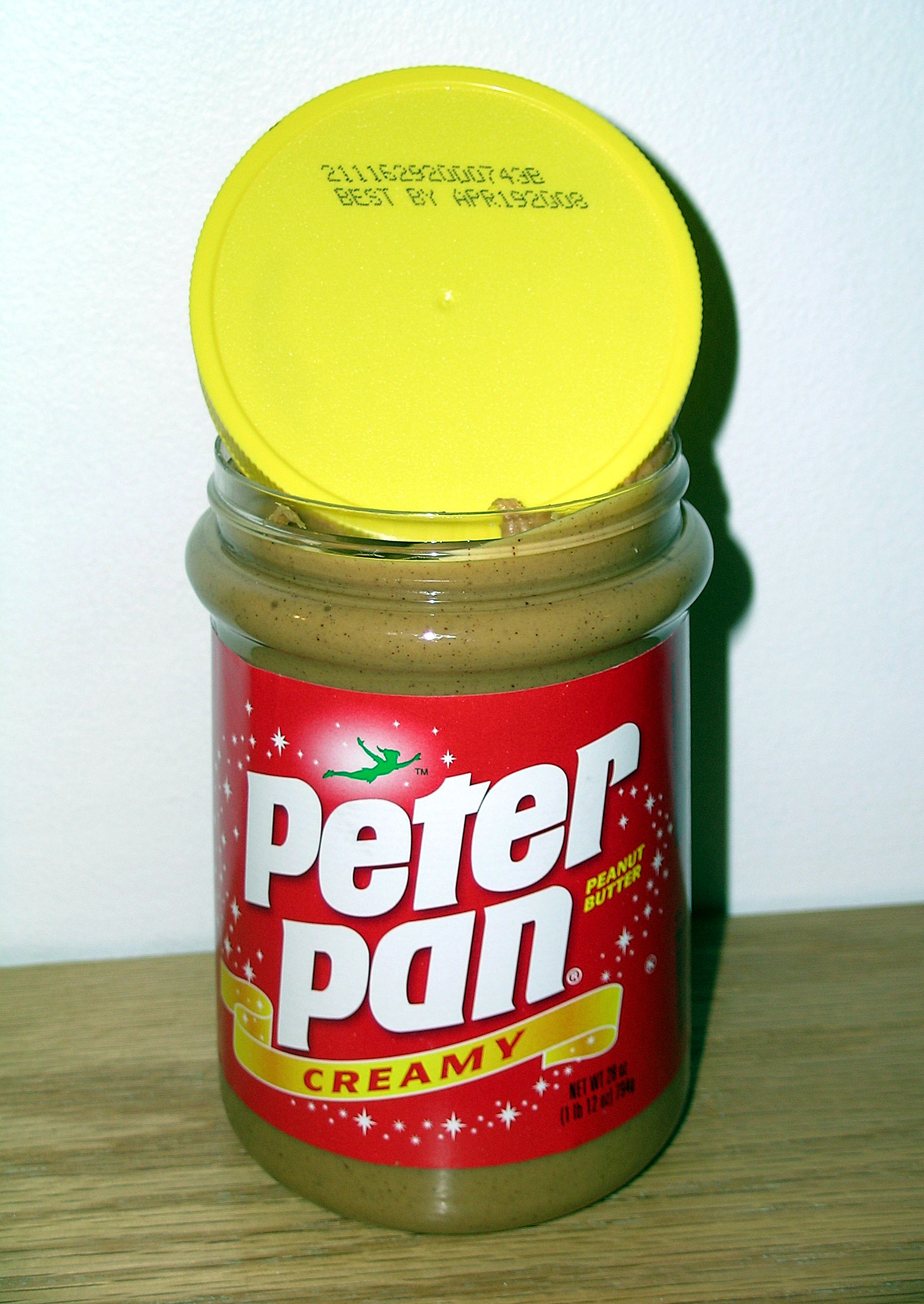
Recalled jar of Peter Pan with "2111" product code

In February and March 2007, Peter Pan and some Great Value (Walmart's store brand) peanut butters were linked to 425 cases of salmonellosis across the United States. Centers for Disease Control and Prevention officials believe this is the first Salmonella outbreak involving peanut butter to occur in the United States.

The recall involved both Peter Pan and some Great Value peanut butter with a product code starting with the digits "2111". The recall included all ConAgra-produced peanut butter sold in the United States since October 2004. Peter Pan products returned to stores in late August 2007.
