= Greenford Park Trotting Track =

Former track in West London, England

- Interactive map of Greenford Park Trotting Track
- Location: Greenford, London Borough of Ealing, west London
- Coordinates: 51°32′27″N 0°21′19″W

Construction
- Opened: 1919
- Closed: 1935

Greenford Park Trotting Track was a trotting track, motorcycle speedway and short-lived greyhound racing track in Greenford, London Borough of Ealing, West London.

== Trotting track ==
The site of the trotting track was on modern day Jeymer Drive, south of Birkbeck Avenue and was opened in 1919 by the London Trotting Club. Charles Sabini who was portrayed in the hit series Peaky Blinders was associated with the track. Sabini and the mob violence at the trotting track were described in detail by Ted Greeno. It closed in 1935.

== Motorcycle speedway ==
The track was a pioneer venue for Speedway with a first meeting on 7 April 1928. The very large dirt track also hosted Sidecar speedway and it was known in speedway circles as the Greenford Driving Park, with the entrances on Birkbeck Avenue. It also hosted speedway meetings in 1931.

== Greyhound Racing ==
The greyhound racing first appeared on 31 October 1927 during the very early years of greyhound racing. There were kennels on site and the Racing Manager was Mr A. Wrightson.

The racing ceased sometime around 1930. The track was a short lived independent (unaffiliated to a governing body). The racing took place on a smaller track inside the trotting track.
