= Greenford =

Town in West London, England

Coordinates: 51.5299°N 0.3488°W

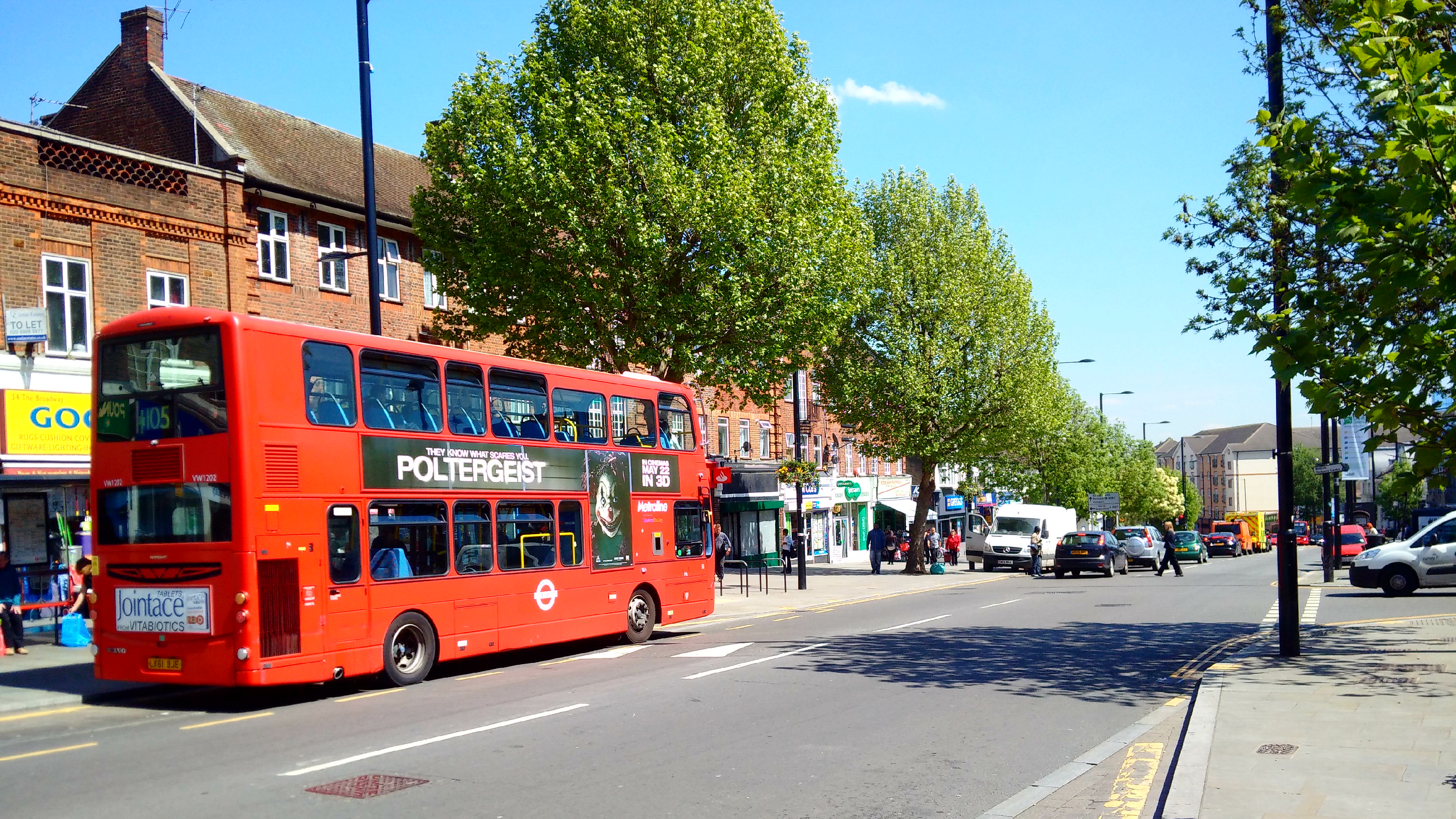
- Greenford Broadway

- Location within Greater London
- Population: 46,787 (2011 Census)
- OS grid reference: TQ135825
- London borough: Ealing
- Ceremonial county: Greater London
- Region: London
- Country: England
- Sovereign state: United Kingdom
- Post town: GREENFORD
- Postcode district: UB6
- Dialling code: 020
- Police: Metropolitan
- Fire: London
- Ambulance: London
- UK Parliament: Ealing North
- London Assembly: Ealing and Hillingdon

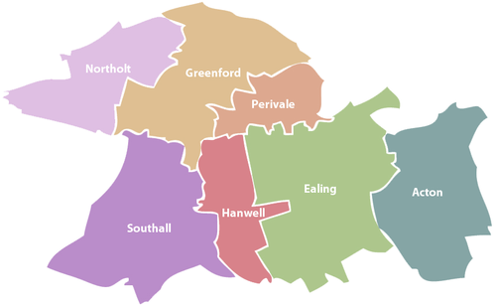
Map of the London Borough of Ealing, showing Greenford and the other seven "towns" which make up the borough.

Greenford (/ˈɡriːnfərd/) is a large town in the London Borough of Ealing in West London, London, England, lying 11 miles (18 km) west from Charing Cross. It has a population of 46,787 inhabitants.

Greenford is served by Greenford Station (London Underground Central Line and Greenford branch of the Great Western Railway mainline service). South Greenford mainline station (on the A40 Western Avenue, also on the Greenford branch of the GWR) is actually in Perivale. Neither station is in Greenford Town Centre (Greenford Broadway), which instead is served by many local buses.

Nearby places include Yeading, Hanwell, Perivale, Southall, Northolt, Ealing, Sudbury and Sudbury Hill. The most prominent landmark in the suburb is Horsenden Hill, 279 feet (85 m) above sea level.

Greenford covers a large area, including the two miles of Greenford Road, giving it three localities: North Greenford, Greenford Green, and Greenford Broadway – this is also reflected in the names of the electoral wards. Though a separate "town" within the borough of Ealing, the Royal Mail includes Perivale within the Greenford post area and as such the two share the UB6 postcode.

== Toponymy ==
The name is first recorded in 848 as Grenan forda. It is formed from the Old English 'grēne' and 'ford' and means 'place at the green ford'. Greenford was known as Great Greenford in order to distinguish it from Little Greenford, which is now known as Perivale (Greenford and Perivale, though different places, still share the UB6 postal code). The affixes 'Magna' and 'Parva' have also been used to denote the difference.

== History ==
Greenford was an ancient parish in the historic Elthorne Hundred, county of Middlesex.

=== Industrial ===
Greenford is considered to be birthplace of the modern organic chemical industry, as it was at William Perkin's chemical factory in North Greenford, by the Grand Union Canal, that the world's first aniline dye was discovered in March 1856. Perkin called his amazing discovery 'mauveine'. Today there is a blue plaque marking the spot in Oldfield Lane North, just south of the Black Horse public house. Local anecdote says that Queen Elizabeth I would only eat bread made from wheat grown in Greenford, and until 2013/14 Greenford was the home to the Hovis factory. The former Rockware glassworks on the canal is commemorated by Rockware Avenue. Greenford formed part of Greenford Urban District from 1894 to 1926 and was then absorbed by the Municipal Borough of Ealing. On 1 October 1926 the civil parish was abolished and merged with Ealing. At the 1921 census (the last before the abolition of the parish), Greenford had a population of 1199.

=== J. Lyons and Co. ===
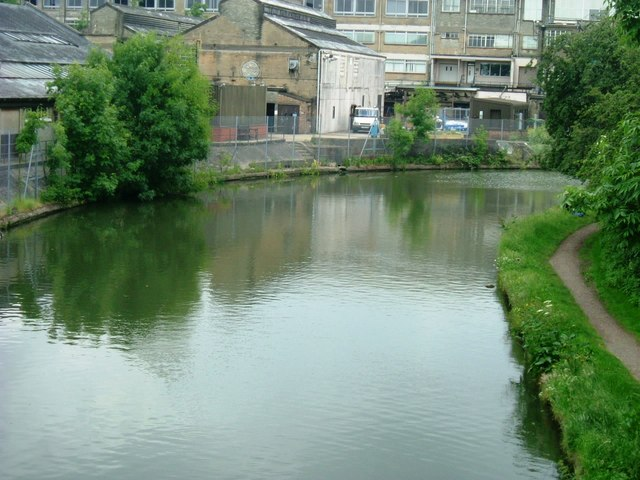
The Grand Union Canal through Greenford in 2008, with the former J. Lyons & Co. factory in the background

Post First World War, tea blender and food manufacturer J. Lyons and Co. were looking for a secondary site on which to expand production beyond Cadby Hall, Hammersmith. In 1921 they bought the first piece of an eventual 63 acres (25 ha) site, due to its location close to good transport links from both the Grand Union Canal and the Great Western Railway's Great Western Main Line, and the West Coast Main Line and onwards to the Midlands at Willesden Junction.

The factory opened in July 1921, with the first single-storey buildings known as "Zig-Zag" due to their northern light-aligned windows allowing maximum light into the production area. There were steam and electrical power plants on site, which powered both the plant as well as the staff canteen and medical facilities, accessible to all plant employees and their dependents. Transport docks and a canal basin had been developed, allowing shipment of tea and coffee directly from London Docks into HM Customs excise controlled bonded warehouses. The extensive onsite railway infrastructure allowed precise positioning of heavy raw goods into the factory, as well as the extraction of finished product. Lyons bought their own steam shunters to move wagons between the GWR exchange sidings and the factory system.

Lyons quickly became Greenford's biggest employer. A later pioneer in electronic machines and computing, Lyons deployed the latest factory automation technology, making Greenford a showplace that was regularly visited by the media, academics, competitors and royalty, with more than one visit by King George V and Queen Mary. In the 1950s, the site developed the breakfast cereal Ready Brek. Areas of the site not initially developed for factory use were landscaped, with many trees planted. As the factory developed these diminished, particularly after the development of the Lyons Maid Bridge Park factory in the 1950s, and the new administration block in 1971.

After the merger of Lyons with Allied Bakeries in the 1980s, and the focus of the new Allied Domecq business to focus on spirits, with the sell-off of the businesses associated with the factory, the need for the facility dwindled. Redeveloped from 1998, today it is known as Lyon Way Industrial Estate.

=== Art and culture ===
Five hundred yards north east from William Perkin's dye factory was a triangular field in which he kept horses. On this ground was built the Oldfield Tavern public house, which became a popular venue for a rock group called the Detours, who met a drummer there called Keith Moon. On Thursday 20 February 1964 they were introduced to the audience of the Oldfield Tavern as the Who. (The tavern has not survived, however, and has since been replaced by a small block of flats and a Texaco petrol station). Andy Locke, Dave Kerr-Clemenson and Wal Scott were all in Edison Lighthouse, and with chart-topping Love Grows all came from Greenford.

=== Expansion ===
Greenford (parish) population
1881	538
1891	545
1901	672
1911	843
1921	1,199
Absorbed by Ealing parish ►
source: UK census

== Education ==
=== Primary and Junior Schools ===
- Coston Primary School
- Horsenden Primary School
- Oldfield Primary School
- Our Lady of the Visitation Catholic Primary School
- Ravenor Primary School
- Selborne Primary School
- Stanhope Primary School
- The Edward Betham CofE Primary School
- Vicar's Green Primary School

=== High schools ===
- The Cardinal Wiseman Catholic School
- William Perkin Church of England High School (an Academy High School)

== Transport ==
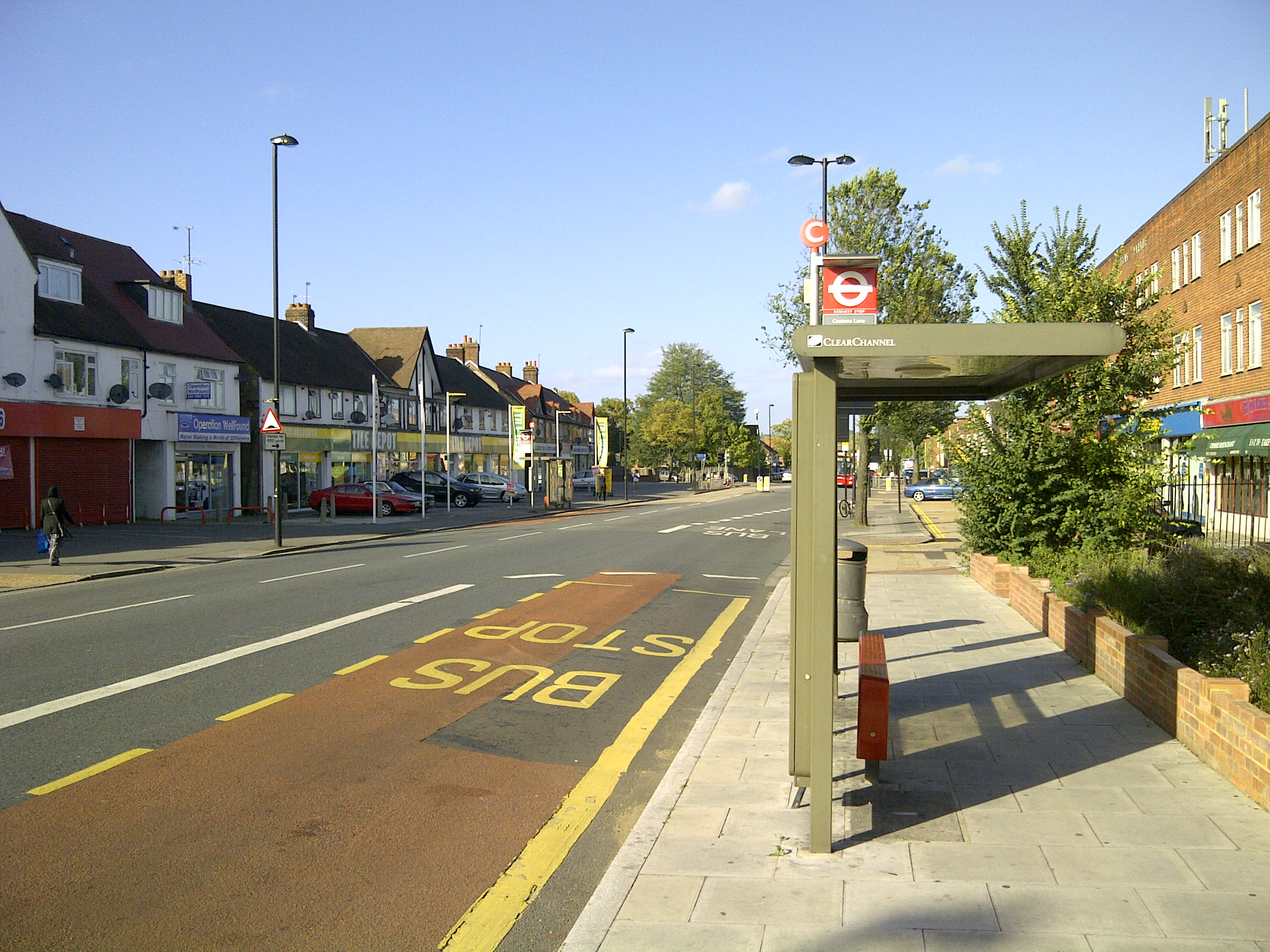
Bus stop on Greenford Road

The A40, a major dual-carriageway, serves the area.

=== Tube ===
North Greenford is served by Sudbury Hill station on the Piccadilly line and Greenford on the Central line.

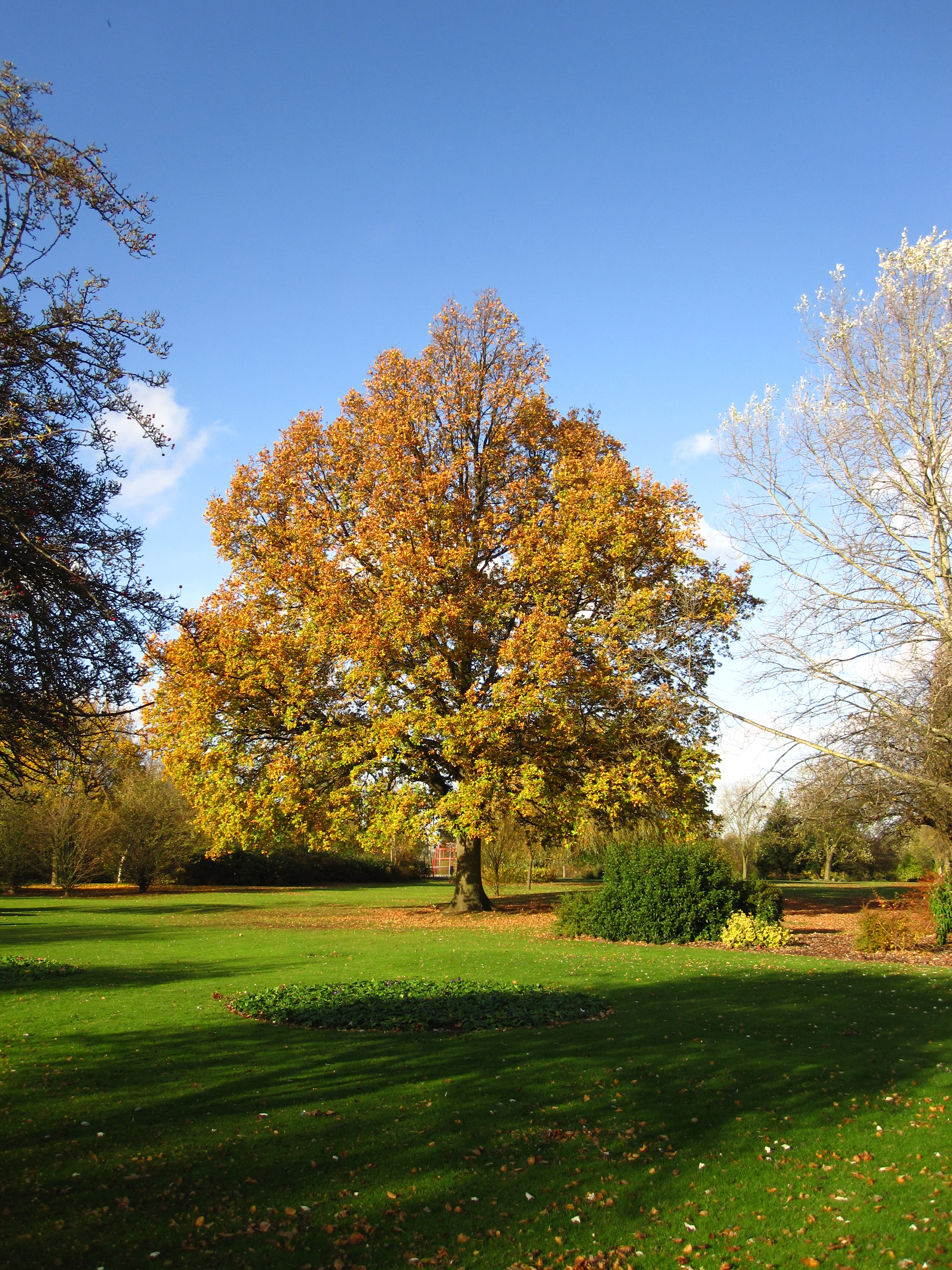
Ravenor Park in Greenford

=== Rail ===
Greenford and South Greenford stations are served by Great Western Railway services on the Greenford branch line to West Ealing.

=== Buses ===
Greenford has the following bus routes travelling through it: 92, 95, 105, 282, 395, 487, E1, E2, E3, E5, E6, E7, E9, E10, E11, H17, N7 and N118.

== Geography ==
The town lies between about 33 feet (10 m) and 98 feet (30 m) above sea level.

=== Parks and recreation ===
The grounds of the former Ravenor Farm has become Greenford's largest park; Ravenor Park is the venue for the annual Greenford Carnival, which is held every July.

Until 1910, the land that formed Ravenor Farm/Ravenor Park was a detached part of Northolt parish, with the tithes to the land going to St. Mary's Church, Northolt and not the Greenford parish of Holy Cross, Greenford.

There are also Perivale Wood, the Horsenden Hill, and Northala Fields near Northolt, Marnham Fields, and Brent Valley Park.

== Demography ==
Greenford is covered by three electoral wards of the London Borough of Ealing, together counting a population of 46,787 as of the 2011 UK census.

2011 Census homes %
Ward	Detached	Semi-detached	Terraced	Flats and apartments
Greenford Broadway	5.0%	22.1%	20.9%	51.6%
Greenford Green	4.8%	39.1%	26.7%	29.4%
North Greenford	4.4%	35.0%	40.2%	20.2%

The median house price as of 2014 was £249,000 in Greenford Broadway, £307,000 in Greenford Green, and £345,000 in North Greenford. In Greenford Green and North Greenford, over 60% of houses are owned, whereas in Greenford Broadway a majority are rented. The population are from a diverse set of backgrounds including Polish, English and other BAME backgrounds (i.e. Black, Asian and minority Ethnic). The median age of those from Black, Asian and minority ethnic backgrounds was 33, 34 and 34 years respectively.

== Sport and leisure ==
Greenford has three Non-League football teams, London Tigers F.C. who play at the Avenue Park Stadium, North Greenford United F.C. who play at Berkeley Fields and Greenford Celtic.

The Greenford Park Trotting Track was a pioneer speedway venue and open meetings were staged 1928–1930. The track would be called a long track now, as it was of the order of half a mile/800 metres per lap. The trotting track was situated on the south side of Birkbeck Avenue, just north of the A40 Western Avenue.

== Places of interest ==
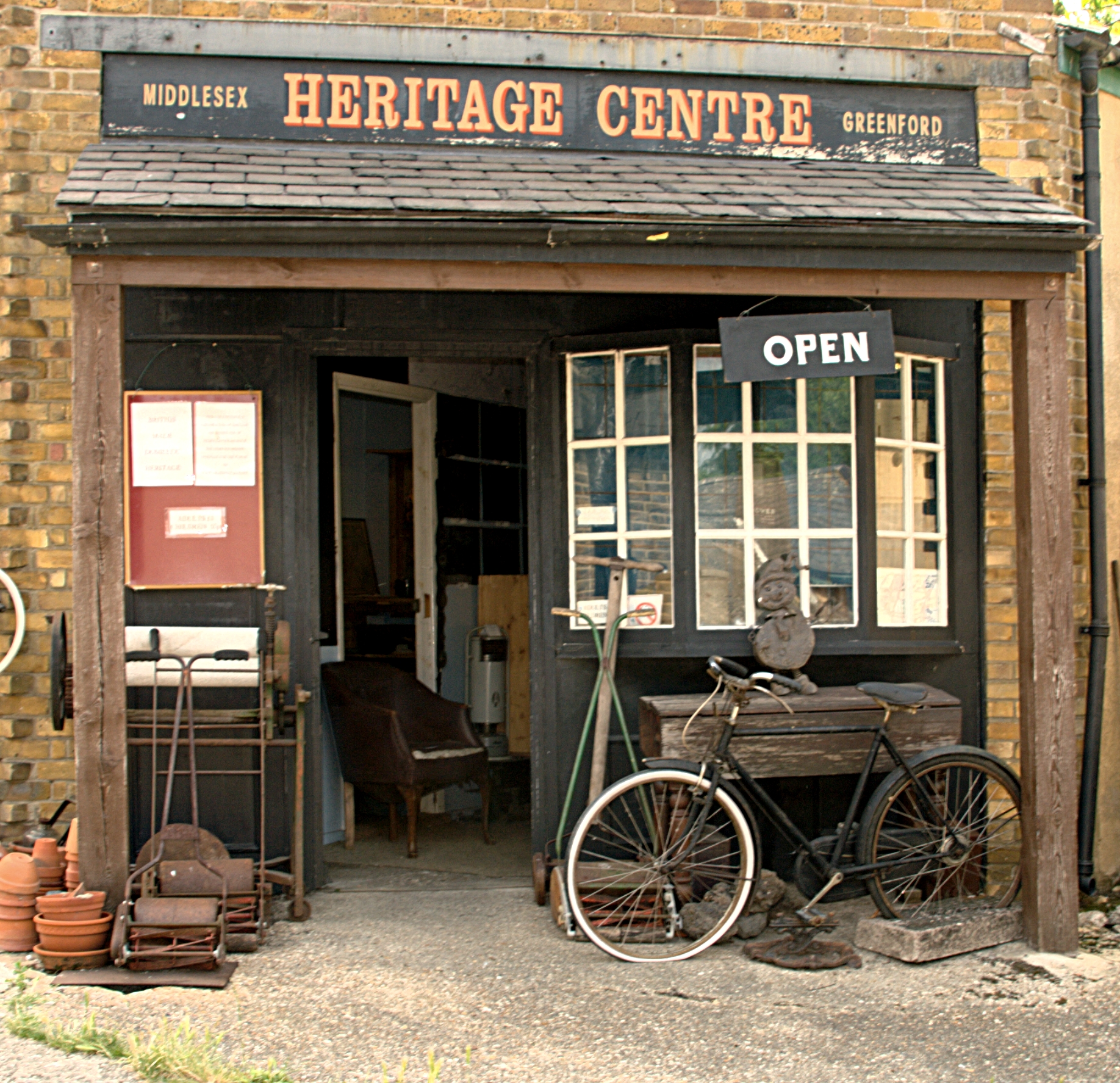
Heritage centre

The Greenford heritage centre displays 20th century British-made domestic household items that were commonly found in British homes and gardens in the past.

The Parish Church of Holy Cross is a late 15th or early 16th century parish church.

Betham House, is an 18th-century former charity school built by Edward Betham.

== Economy ==
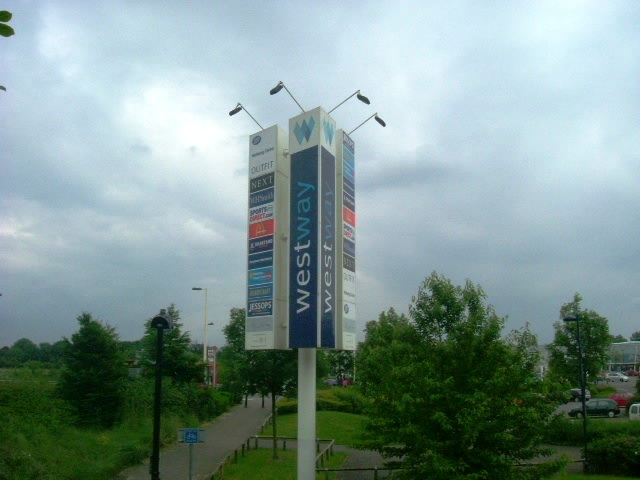
Sign at the Westway Cross Shopping Park

Significant local businesses include: British Bakeries, Brompton Bicycle, IBM, Aurora (TV Lighting), Panavision, Panalux, Wincanton (Distribution Centre) and Royal Mail (Regional distribution centre). KBR has an office in Greenford.

The Westway Cross Shopping Park is in Greenford Green. This retail park has stores including Next, Smyths Toys and Sports Direct.

== Political representation ==
Greenford is part of the Ealing North UK parliamentary constituency, represented since 2019 by Labour and Co-operative Party Member of Parliament (MP) James Murray.

Greenford is made up of four and a half electoral wards for local council elections: Central Greenford, Greenford Broadway, Greenford Green, North Greenford and half of the Lady Margaret ward, which is situated on the south side of Greenford Broadway. These wards all elect councillors to Ealing Council. Ealing Council is currently run by a Labour administration.

Political status of Ealing Council after the May 2022 local elections:

- Labour: 59 seats
- Conservatives: 6 seats
- Liberal Democrats: 5 seats

Greenford is in the London Assembly constituency of Ealing and Hillingdon which has one assembly member: Onkar Sahota (Labour), who was elected in May 2012.

== Notable people ==
- Vernon Elliott (1912–1996), bassoonist, conductor and composer, lived at 181 Sudbury Heights Avenue in the 1930s.
- Elyar Fox, pop singer, was brought up in Greenford.
- Doug Sandom, musician, (1930-2019) was born in Greenford. Sandom was the original Who drummer.
- Bukayo Saka, professional footballer, was raised in Greenford and attended Greenford High School.
