= Barry's Tea =

Irish tea company

- Founded: Cork, Ireland (1901)
- Headquarters: Cork, Ireland
- Key people: James J. Barry
- Products: Black Teas, Green Teas & Fruit and Herbal Teas
- Number of employees: 65 (2015)
- Website: https://www.barrystea.ie

Barry's Tea is an Irish tea company founded in 1901 by James J. Barry in Cork. Until the 1960s, tea was sold from a shop in Prince's Street, but thereafter the company expanded its wholesaling and distribution operations following its growing popularity. There is a common debate in Ireland about which Irish tea is superior —Barry's Tea or Lyons Tea.

== History ==
In 1960, Peter Barry, Anthony’s son, pioneered the concept of wholesaling tea and began sourcing tea from East Africa, introducing blends that quickly gained widespread acclaim. By the mid-1980s, Barry's Tea had become a beloved national brand. According to their website, they are currently responsible for 38% of all tea sales in the Irish market (which is worth an estimated €85 million annually). Today, Barry's Tea is also available in the United Kingdom, Spain, and in some areas of Canada, Australia, France, Luxembourg and the United States where there are significant Irish immigrant communities.

Members of the Barry family have been elected representatives for Fine Gael: the founder's son Anthony Barry (TD 1954–1957 and 1961–1965), Anthony's son Peter Barry (TD 1969–1997) and Peter's daughter Deirdre Clune (TD 1997–2001 and 2007–2011, and MEP from 2014 to 2024).

== Controversies ==
In May 2018, it was revealed that many of Barry's Tea teabags are made with polypropylene, a non-compostable plastic which is damaging to the environment. As of August 2021, the company claimed that it had made 100% of its teabags biodegradable.

Barry's Tea was a major sponsor of the greyhound racing industry in Ireland. As of July 2019, the sponsorship has been pulled indefinitely.

== See also ==
- List of Irish companies
