= Hornimans =

Brand of tea

- Product type: Tea
- Current owner: JDE Peet's
- Country: Isle of Wight, England
- Introduced: 1826
- Markets: Spain, Peru, Uruguay, Ecuador, Colombia, etc.
- Previous owners: Sara Lee; J. Lyons & Co.
- Registered as a trademark in: Spain, Portugal, most of South America

Hornimans is a brand of tea currently owned by JDE Peet's.

== History ==
The original tea trading and blending business 'Horniman's Tea Company' was founded in 1826 in Newport, Isle of Wight, by trader John Horniman. In 1852, he moved the company to London to be closer to the bonded warehouses of London Docks, then the biggest tea trading port in the world.

Until 1826, only loose leaf teas had been sold, allowing unscrupulous traders to increase profits by adding other items such as hedge clippings or dust. Horniman revolutionised the tea trade by using mechanical devices to speed the process of filling pre-sealed packages, thereby reducing his cost of production and hence improving the quality for the end customer. This caused some consternation amongst his competitors, but by 1891 Horniman's was the largest tea trading business in the world. Friedrich Nietzsche once mentioned in private correspondence that it was his favourite tea.

In the 1870s, the business was taken over by his son Frederick John Horniman (1835–1906), who subsequently invested much of his fortune for social purposes. An avid collector since childhood, he travelled extensively, and founded and built the Horniman Museum in Forest Hill, south London, to house his various collections. Today the museum houses some 350,000 items, of which the core 10% are from Frederick's original donation.

Post World War I, in 1918 Frederick's son Emslie Horniman sold the business to J. Lyons & Co., who moved production to their new factory in Greenford, Middlesex, in July 1921. United States distribution ended in 1993. However, Horniman's Tea remains a popular brand of tea and infusions in Spain and Uruguay.
