= Ceres Fruit Juices =

South African beverage company

- Type: Private
- Industry: Fruit juice manufacturing Agriculture
- Founded: 1986; 40 years ago
- Headquarters: Ceres (Cape Winelands District Municipality), Western Cape, South Africa
- Area served: Worldwide
- Key people: Pieter Hanekom (CEO); M. J. Truter (CFO)
- Products: Ceres Fruit Juices; Liqui-Fruit; Superfruit; Squeeza; Daly’s; Wild Island; Caribbean
- Parent: Pioneer Foods
- Website: ceres.co.za

Ceres Fruit Juices Pty Ltd, trading as The Ceres Beverage Company, is a beverage company based in Ceres, South Africa. It produces fruit juice and other fruit based products and is a subsidiary of Pioneer Foods.

Ceres advertises their products being made from 100% fruit juice without preservatives. They are manufactured using aseptic processing. The products are widely sold in Africa, and exported to over 80 countries in areas including North America, Europe, and Asia. The United States is one of the company's largest markets .

The company is named after the town of Ceres in the Western Cape, South Africa where it was founded in 1986, by local fruit farmers.

The Ceres valley is an important fruit growing region in southern Africa, particularly for apples, pears and stone fruits. Ceres became a wholly owned subsidiary of the Bellville-based Pioneer Foods in 2004.

== Products ==
Ceres products sold under the Ceres brand name include:

- Ceres 100% Juice (22 flavors available in various carton sizes)
- Ceres Junior Juice (5 flavors with added vitamins, aimed at children)
- Ceres Sparkling (3 flavors available in cans and glass bottles of various sizes)
- Ceres Delight (5 flavors in cartons available for export only)
- Ceres Fruit Tea (3 flavors of still iced fruit tea blended with 20% fruit juice available for export only)
- Ceres Spring Water (still and sparkling water in a variety of plastic bottle sizes)
- Ceres Squash Concentrate (4 flavors in plastic bottles)
- Ceres Nectar Concentrate (5 flavors in plastic bottles)
