= Dakota Growers =

American pasta processing company

Dakota Growers Pasta Co.
- Company type: Subsidiary
- Industry: Food
- Founded: 1990; 35 years ago
- Fate: Acquired by Viterra in 2010, becoming a brand
- Headquarters: Carrington, North Dakota, U.S.
- Key people: Mike Ness (Plant Manager); Jack Dalrymple (Chairman)
- Products: Pasta
- Owner: Post Holdings (2014–pres.)
- Website: 8avepasta.com

Dakota Growers Pasta Company is an American brand of pasta and food processing, currently owned by 8th Avenue, a company of Post Holdings. The former Dakota Growers agricultural processing company was located in Carrington, North Dakota, having started in 1990 as a wheat-growers cooperative. In 2002, Dakota Growers became a public company. As per media reports, Dakota Growers Pasta Company was the third largest pasta manufacturer in North America in 2002, processing about 1.5 million pounds of pasta daily.

Announced as a joint press release on March 10, 2010, Dakota Growers Pasta Company was sold to the Canadian-based agribusiness, Viterra, Inc. Following Viterra's acquisition by Glencore Xstrata, Dakota Growers was sold to Post Holdings on January 1, 2014.

== Television ==
Vice President David Tressler and the plant were featured on the Food Network show Unwrapped. The episode focused on the manufacture of Dakota Growers Pasta's Dreamfields low-carb pasta line.

== Products ==
- Dry pasta
- Semolina
- Durum wheat
- Mill feed by-products
