= Alpen (food) =

Breakfast cereal made by Weetabix

- Product type: Muesli
- Current owner: Weetabix
- Country: United Kingdom
- Introduced: 1971; 55 years ago
- Markets: United Kingdom; United States; Canada
- Website: alpen.co.uk

Alpen is a line of muesli varieties manufactured by the Weetabix cereal company of Kettering, Northamptonshire, England.

== History ==
Weetabix cereals in the UK created Alpen muesli cereal in 1971. Alpen is a whole grain muesli cereal consisting of rolled oats, fruits and nuts.

In the UK, Alpen has been a staple on British shelves since the 1970s, accounting for 3% of the UK and Ireland breakfast cereal sales in 2003. It appeared in the early 1970s in Canada and then in the US in the 1990s after Weetabix established a partnership with natural foods manufacturer, Barbara's Bakery.

In North America, Alpen No Added Sugar and Alpen Original are mainstays in U.S. natural food stores and Canadian grocery stores. In the UK, Weetabix sells Alpen in four varieties. Alpen is exported to other countries in several varieties.

== Related cereals and products ==
In the UK, Alpen has created several varieties, including:

- Alpen Original
- Alpen Original (No Added Sugar)
- Alpen Chocolate
- Alpen High Fruit
- Alpen High Fibre

Currently, Alpen produces Alpen Original and Alpen Original (No Added Sugar).

In both the U.S. and Canada, Alpen varieties are:

- Alpen Original
- Alpen No Added Sugar
- New Alpen Apple Spice was introduced in Canada in 2010, featuring three whole grains, apples, toasted soy nuggets and flax seed, with 500 mg of Omega ALA.

As of December 2009, the U.S. Alpens were reformulated to an all-natural formula, discontinuing the use of added vitamins, minerals and organic grains.

In the past, several non-muesli Alpen cereals debuted under the Alpen brand. While most of these cereals have undergone changes in name only, here is a list of cereals which at one point were in the Alpen division of Weetabix, along with date of name change.

- Alpen Wheat Flakes (formerly Advantage cereal) — 2004
- Alpen Crunchy Bran (formerly Crunchy Bran cereal) — 2004

As a brand extension and a reaction to consumer appetite for whole grain snacks, Weetabix introduced Alpen whole grain cereal bars, which include varieties of several fruit flavours. As of January 2025, the lower-calorie Alpen Delight line, which replaced the Alpen Light line in 2023, includes:

- Chocolate Brownie
- Salted Caramel
- White Chocolate Raspberry & Shortcake
- Chocolate, Caramel, & Shortbread
- Chocolate Honeycomb
- Raspberry Rocky Road

The Alpen Bars line includes:

- Strawberry & Yogurt (red)
- Fruit & Nut with Chocolate (brown)
- Coconut with Chocolate (blue)

The following flavours have been discontinued:

- Alpen Apple, Blackberry, & Yogurt Bars
- Alpen Apricot & Yoghurt Bars
- Alpen Trail Bars Fruit & Nut
- Alpen Trail Bars - Chunky Nuts
- Alpen Trail Bars - Big Berries
- Alpen Light - Citrus Fruit Bars
- Alpen Light - Chocolate & Fudge
- Alpen Light - Double Chocolate
- Alpen Light - Summer Fruit
- Raspberry & Yoghurt (pink)
- Alpen Light - Chocolate & Orange
- Alpen Light - Apple & Sultana
- Alpen Light - Jaffa Cake
- Alpen Light - Cherry Bakewell

== Sugar and whey content ==
Three varieties of UK Alpen include sugar; there is one No Added Sugar variety, also available in the U.S. and Canada. Alpen also contains whey.

== See also ==
- Breakfast cereal
- List of breakfast cereals
- List of almond dishes
- Muesli
