= Bokomo =

South African food brand

- Product type: Food
- Current owner: Pioneer Foods
- Produced by: Pioneer Foods
- Country: South Africa
- Introduced: 1920; 106 years ago
- Markets: South Africa
- Previous owners: Independent (Boland Co-operative Millers)
- Tagline: Good for every kind of different
- Website: bokomo.co.za

Bokomo Foods is a major South African food brand, and one of the country's largest cereal brands. Founded as an independent company in 1920, Bokomo is now a division of local company Pioneer Foods, which itself is a subsidiary of PepsiCo.

== History ==
Bokomo Foods traces its origins back to (Afrikaans: Bolandse Kooperatiewe Molenaars, lit. 'Boland Co-operative Millers'), a wheat co-operative founded in 1920 by seven Western Cape farmers.

In 1929, Australians Bennison Osbourne and Malcolm MacFarlane formed the British and African Cereal Co Ltd., which began producing a new type of cereal, called Weet-Bix. The two traveled to South Africa in 1948, built a factory in Cape Town, and started producing Weet-Bix there. They eventually decided to sell the product under the name Bokomo.

In 1962, Dr. Fox of the Medical Research Institute of Johannesburg worked with Bokomo to research and launch the ProNutro cereal brand.

In the 1980s, Bokomo opened its second Weet-Bix factory, located in Atlantis. By 1988, the product had become the most popular cereal in SA.

In 1997, Bokomo merged with South African food company Sasko, to form Pioneer Foods.

In March 2020, Bokomo's parent company, Pioneer Foods, was acquired by American FMCG company PepsiCo.

In 2021, Bokomo launched a brand refresh and new corporate identity. The following year, the company celebrated its 100th anniversary.

== Products ==
As of 2026, products within the Bokomo portfolio include:

Product type	Brand	Established	Acquired	Ref.
Cereal	Weet-Bix	1929; 97 years ago	1948; 78 years ago	
Cereal	ProNutro	1962; 64 years ago	1999; 27 years ago	
Cereal	Bokomo Corn Flakes	1990s; 35 years ago	In-house	
Cereal	Bokomo Bran Flakes		In-house	
Cereal	OTEES		2001; 25 years ago	
Granola	Nature's Source	1990s; 35 years ago	2001; 25 years ago	
Porridge	Bokomo Oats	1948; 78 years ago	In-house	
