= Ready Brek =

Breakfast cereal made by Weetabix

- Place of origin: United Kingdom
- Created by: J. Lyons and Co.
- Main ingredients: Oats
- Food energy (per serving): 142 kcal (590 kJ)

Ready Brek (stylized as Ready brek) is an oat-based breakfast cereal produced by Weetabix Limited. It is intended to be served hot, and comes in two varieties — 'original' and 'chocolate'. Other variants were available but have since been discontinued.

Original Ready brek is a mix of rolled oat flakes and oat flour fortified with vitamins. It is usually prepared by heating it with milk.

== History ==
Ready Brek was originally produced by J. Lyons and Co., created from experimentation by Walter Pitts, the Greenford factory manager from the Tea Division of Lyons.

It was launched in 1957 as an instant porridge, then in 1969 as an instant hot cereal. The product is now called a smooth porridge, as porridge is now once again popular. The brand was purchased by Weetabix in June 1990, and it is more popular in autumn and winter. Ready Brek had the slogans "Central heating for kids" and "Get up and Glow", and television adverts during the 1970s and 1980s showed children walking to school with a superimposed radiant glow. The voice over for the commercials was provided by Jon Pertwee.

In 2017, Ready Brek teamed up with Walker Books' popular children's book and brand We're Going on a Bear Hunt to run a campaign promoting getting outdoors and adopting a healthy, balanced lifestyle.

== Flavours ==
=== In production ===
- Original
- Chocolate

=== Discontinued ===
- Banana
- Butterscotch
- Strawberry
- Butter
- Golden Syrup
- Gingerbread
- Toffee
- Seriously Oaty
- Honey
