= North Acton Halt railway station =

Short-lived railway station in North Acton, Greater London

North Acton Halt

General information
- Location: North Acton, Greater London; England
- Coordinates: 51.5251°N 0.2668°W
- Grid reference: TQ203821

Other information
- Status: Disused

History
- Original company: Great Western Railway
- Pre-grouping: Great Western Railway

Key dates
- 1 May 1904: Opened
- 1 February 1913: Closed
Location

North Acton Halt railway station served the North Acton area of Acton, London, England, from 1904 to 1913 on the Acton-Northolt line.

== History ==
The station was opened on 1 May 1904 by the Great Western Railway. It was a short-lived station, closing on 1 February 1913.

Preceding station	Disused railways	Following station
Old Oak Lane Halt; Line and station closed	Great Western Railway; Acton-Northolt line	Park Royal; Line and station closed
