= Brentham for North Ealing and Greystoke Park railway station =

Disused railway station in England

Brentham for North Ealing and Greystoke Park
- Location of Brentham for North Ealing and Greystoke Park in Greater London
- Location: Park Royal
- Local authority: London Borough of Ealing
- Number of platforms: 2

Railway companies
- Original company: Great Western Railway
- Pre-grouping: Great Western Railway
- Post-grouping: Great Western Railway

Key dates
- 1 May 1911: Opened
- 1 February 1915: Closed
- 29 March 1920: Reopened
- 15 June 1947: Closed
- Replaced by: Hanger Lane

Other information
- Coordinates: 51.5310°N 0.2978°W

Brentham for North Ealing and Greystoke Park was a railway station in Park Royal, London, on the New North Main Line. The station opened as Brentham on 1 May 1911 as a replacement for Twyford Abbey Halt. The name was changed to Brentham (for North Ealing) in 1932 and was later extended further to include "Greystoke Park". It closed on 15 June 1947 in advance of the opening of the extension of the Central Line from North Acton to Greenford on 30 June 1947. It was replaced by Hanger Lane.

Preceding station	Disused railways	Following station
Perivale Halt	Great Western Railway; New North Main Line (1911-37)	Park Royal
Perivale Halt	Great Western Railway; New North Main Line (1937-47)	Park Royal West Halt
