= Perivale tube station =

London Underground station

Perivale
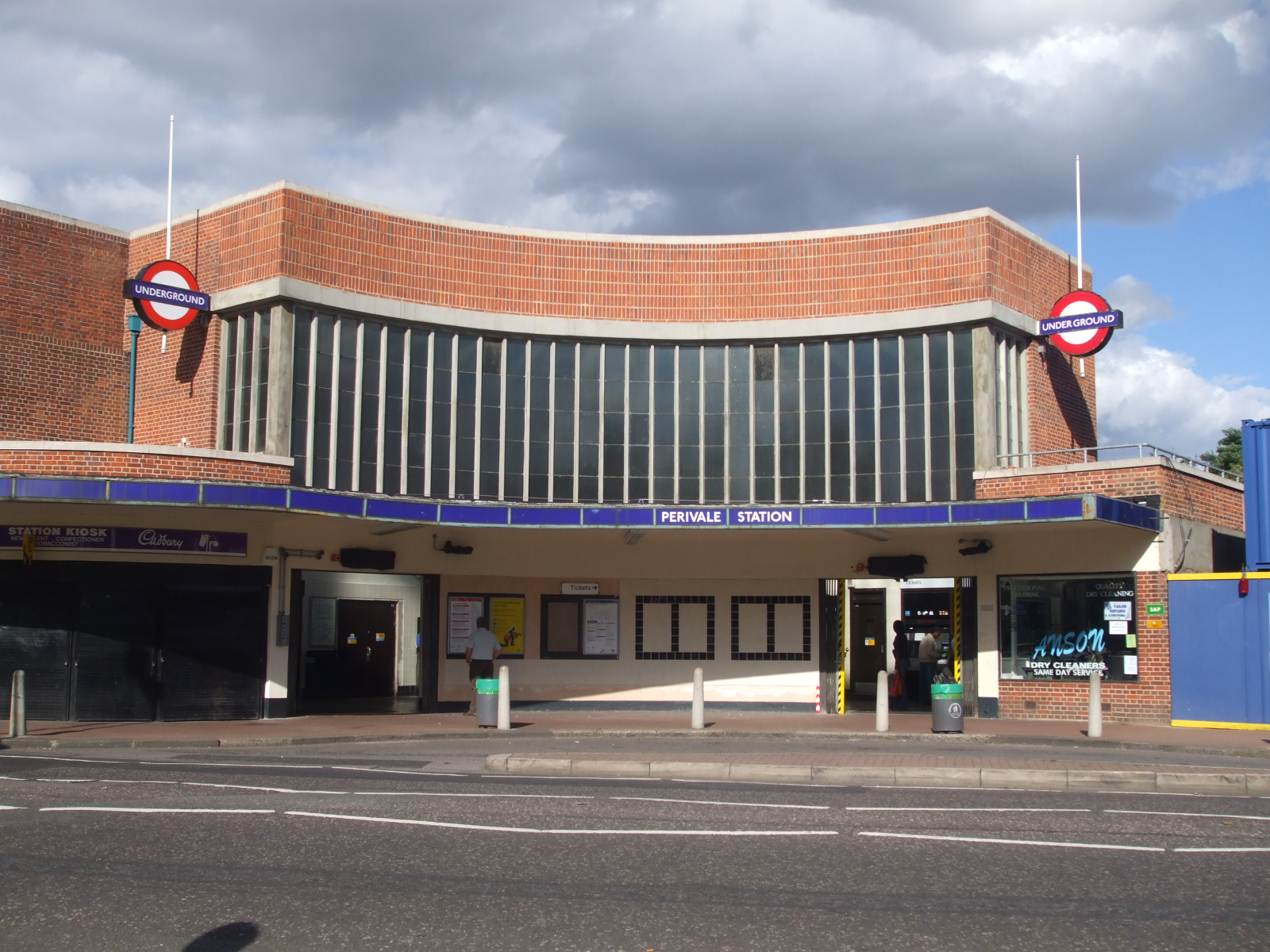
- The curved station building designed by Brian Lewis
- Interactive map of Perivale

General information
- Location: Perivale
- Local authority: London Borough of Ealing
- Managed by: London Underground
- Number of platforms: 2
- Fare zone: 4

London Underground annual entry and exit
- 2021: ▼1.08 million
- 2022: ▲1.69 million
- 2023: ▲1.72 million
- 2024: ▼1.69 million
- 2025: ▼1.60 million

Key dates
- 30 June 1947: Opened

Listed status
- Listing grade: II
- Entry number: 1400747
- Added to list: 20 July 2011; 15 years ago

Other information
- External links: TfL station info page
- Coordinates: 51.5366°N 0.3233°W

Perivale (/ˈpɛrɪveɪl/) is a London Underground station in Perivale, north-west London. It is on the West Ruislip branch of the Central line, between Greenford and Hanger Lane stations. It is in London fare zone 4.

== History ==
The Great Western Railway (GWR) opened Perivale Halt on its New North Main Line (now the Acton–Northolt line) on 2 May 1904. This was closed when the current London Underground station was opened on 30 June 1947, as part of the extension of the Central line to West Ruislip. The station was designed in 1938 by Brian Lewis, later the GWR's chief architect, but completion was delayed by the Second World War. The finished building was modified by the architect Frederick Francis Charles Curtis. A planned tower and extended wing were never built, leaving the station smaller than intended. In July 2011, the station was one of 16 London Underground stations that were given Grade II listed status.

== Services ==
Perivale station is on the West Ruislip branch of the Central line in London fare zone 4. It is between Greenford to the west and Hanger Lane to the east. The typical off-peak service on the Central line in trains per hour (tph) is:

- 9 tph westbound to West Ruislip
- 3 tph westbound to Northolt
- 9 tph eastbound to Epping
- 3 tph eastbound to Loughton

Preceding station	London Underground	Following station
Greenford towards West Ruislip	Central line West Ruislip branch	Hanger Lane towards Epping, Hainault or Woodford via Newbury Park

== Connections ==
London Buses route 297 serves the station.

== TV appearances ==
The front of the station featured briefly in the first episode of the 2005 BBC series The Thick of It. It also appeared in the second episode of the 1994 BBC series The Fast Show, featuring John Thomson.
