= Park Royal West Halt railway station =

Former railway station in England

Park Royal West Halt
- Location of Park Royal West Halt in Greater London
- Location: Park Royal
- Local authority: London Borough of Ealing
- Number of platforms: 2

Railway companies
- Original company: Great Western Railway
- Post-grouping: Great Western Railway

Key dates
- 20 June 1932: Opened
- 15 June 1947: Closed
- Replaced by: Hanger Lane

Other information
- Coordinates: 51.5290°N 0.2863°W

Park Royal West Halt was a railway station in Park Royal, London. It was opened on 20 June 1932 and closed on 15 June 1947 in advance of the opening of the extension of the London Underground's Central Line from North Acton to Greenford. The station was replaced by Hanger Lane to the north-west.

Preceding station	Disused railways	Following station
Brentham for North Ealing and Greystoke Park	Great Western Railway; New North Main Line (1932-37)	Park Royal
Brentham for North Ealing and Greystoke Park	Great Western Railway; New North Main Line (1937-47)	North Acton
