= Brian Lewis (architect) =

Australian architect (1906–1991)

Brian Bannatyne Lewis (20 September 1906 – 23 August 1991) was Professor of Architecture at the University of Melbourne.

He was born in Lottah, Tasmania, Australia, the son of James Bannatyne Lewis and Edith Augusta Haynes. Lewis attended school at Wesley College, Melbourne. and then studied architecture at the University of Melbourne where he gained his Diploma in Architecture in 1928.

In 1928 he moved to Britain and studied at the Liverpool School of Architecture, where he won the Honan Scholarship in 1929 and the Victory scholarships in 1930 and 1931. In the early 1930s, he moved to London and was employed by the Great Western Railway. In 1940 he enlisted in the Australian armed forces in London. After a period in the Middle East and Australia, he returned to Britain in October 1942 as Assistant Chief Architect to the Great Western Railway, becoming Chief Architect in 1945 on the retirement of Percy Emerson Culverhouse, He resigned in 1947.

In 1947, Lewis was appointed as first Chair of Architecture at the University of Melbourne and shortly after was appointed consulting architect to design the major buildings of the Australian National University. During his time at Melbourne University, Lewis designed Risdon Prison Complex circa 1960, and collaborated with Japanese architect Shigeru Yura to design The Japanese Room at Melbourne School of Design in the 1960s.

Lewis wrote two books on family life, Sunday at Kooyong Road, based on childhood reminiscence of living at 41 Kooyong Road, Armadale, Melbourne, and Our War, a view of World War I from inside an Australian family.

Lewis was the first chairman of the National Trust in Victoria in 1957 and was instrumental in the designation of "Notable Town" status to the town of Maldon, Victoria.

== Works ==
- West Acton tube station 1940
- Perivale tube station 1947 (finished by Frederick Curtis)
- Greenford tube station 1947 (finished by Frederick Curtis)
- South Ruislip tube station 1948
- Hanger Lane tube station 1949 (finished by Fredereick Curtis)

== Publications ==
Sunday at Kooyong Road, Hutchison, 1976, ISBN 0-09-130130-0
Our War, Melbourne University Publishing, 1980, ISBN 0-14-005907-5
