= East Acton =

- Location within Greater London
- OS grid reference: TQ205805
- London borough: Ealing; Hammersmith & Fulham
- Ceremonial county: Greater London
- Region: London
- Country: England
- Sovereign state: United Kingdom
- Post town: LONDON
- Postcode district: W3 / W12
- Dialling code: 020
- Police: Metropolitan
- Fire: London
- Ambulance: London
- UK Parliament: Ealing Central and Acton
- London Assembly: Ealing and Hillingdon; West Central

East Acton is an area in Acton in London, England, 5.3 miles (9 km) west of Charing Cross. It is partly in the London Borough of Hammersmith and Fulham and partly in the London Borough of Ealing. It is served by East Acton Underground station, on the Central line in London fare zone 2.

Historically, East Acton and Acton developed as separate settlements and the nearby districts of North Acton, West Acton and South Acton were developed in the late nineteenth century.

Since 3 July 2012, East Acton has been home to the cathedral of the Syriac Orthodox Church in the United Kingdom. The cathedral, dedicated to Saint Thomas, was formally consecrated on 17 November 2016, in the presence of Prince Charles.

== Transport ==
The nearest London Underground station is East Acton on the Central line.

== Notable people ==
For notable people born in Hammersmith Hospital and Queen Charlotte's Hospital see Queen Charlotte's and Chelsea Hospital.

- Peter Ackroyd, writer, lived in East Acton.
- Roger Daltrey, lead vocalist of The Who.

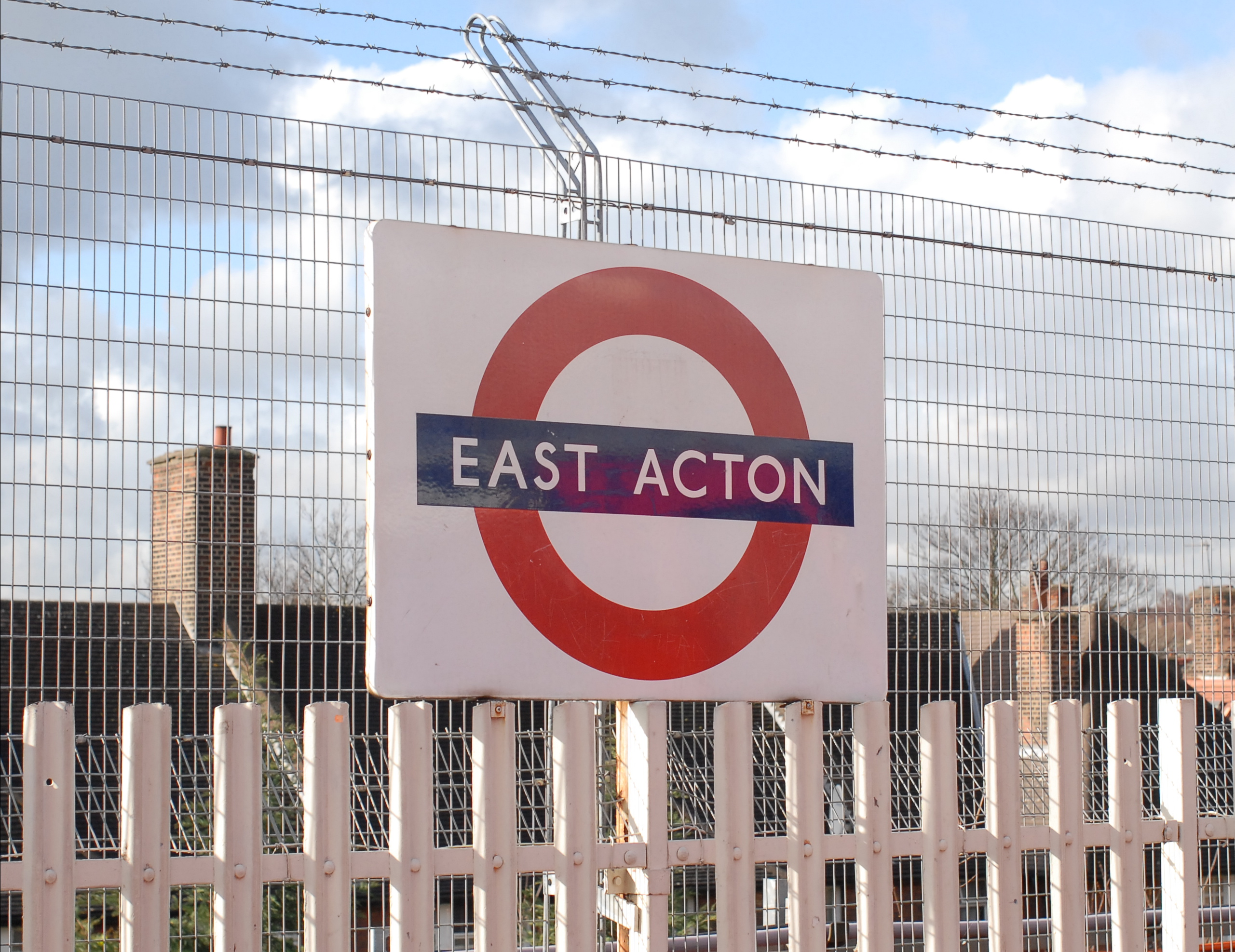
East Acton Tube Station
