= Old Oak Lane Halt railway station =

Former railway station in England

Coordinates: 51.5226°N 0.2526°W

Old Oak Lane Halt

General information
- Location: North Acton, London Borough of Ealing; England
- Grid reference: TQ213818
- Platforms: 2

Other information
- Status: Disused

History
- Original company: Great Western Railway
- Pre-grouping: Great Western Railway
- Post-grouping: Great Western Railway

Key dates
- 1 October 1906: Station opened
- 1 February 1915: Closed
- 29 March 1920: Re-opened
- 30 June 1947: Station closed
Location

Old Oak Lane Halt railway station was the first station on the "New North Main Line" (NNML, present-day Acton–Northolt line) of the Great Western Railway. It served the area between North Acton and Old Oak Common, and was in use between 1906 and 1947. At least one of the platform shelters was of the Pagoda pattern.

== History ==
The station was opened by the Great Western Railway Company on 1 October 1906 within the complex of lines at the south east end of the New North Main Line, a location with low potential for passenger traffic.

The station closed temporarily on 1 February 1915, reopening on 29 March 1920.

The station closed permanently on 30 June 1947 without a replacement when the Central line of London Underground was extended from North Acton to West Ruislip alongside the NNML under the 1935-1940 New Works Programme delayed by World War II.

== Old Oak Common ==
As part of the construction for HS2 a station is being constructed named Old Oak Common which will be a major interchange between the North London Line, the West London Line, Watford DC Line, West Coast Main Line and Great Western Main Line.

== See also ==
- List of closed railway stations in London

Preceding station	National Rail	Following station
North Acton; Line closed and station open	Great Western Railway; New North Main Line	Westbourne Park; Line closed and station open
	Planned routes	
Preceding station	National Rail	Following station
South Ruislip	Chiltern Railways; Acton–Northolt line	Terminus
