= Perivale Halt railway station =

Former railway station in England

Perivale Halt
- Location of Perivale Halt in Greater London
- Location: Perivale
- Local authority: London Borough of Ealing
- Grid reference: TQ162833
- Number of platforms: 2

Railway companies
- Original company: Great Western Railway
- Pre-grouping: Great Western Railway
- Post-grouping: Great Western Railway

Key dates
- 1 May 1904: Opened
- 1 February 1915: Closed
- 29 March 1920: Re-opened
- 15 June 1947: Closed
- Replaced by: Perivale

Other information
- Coordinates: 51.5371°N 0.3250°W

Perivale Halt railway station was a station on the New North Main Line of the Great Western Railway. It served the London suburb of Perivale from 1904 to 1947, when it was replaced by Perivale station on the Central line of the London Underground.

== History ==
The station was opened by the Great Western Railway (GWR) on 1 May 1904, originally being named Perivale. It had long wooden platforms, and pagoda huts, on an embankment reached by sloping paths west of Horsenden Lane South. The steam "push-and-pull" passenger service ran to Paddington (Bishop's Road), the line was shared with freight, and express trains to Birmingham (2 hours, non-stop). Until the late 1920s, Perivale was entirely rural, despite its proximity to Ealing. A similar halt was at South Greenford before it was modernised by Network SouthEast.

The station closed temporarily on 1 February 1915, reopening on 29 March 1920; and on 10 July 1922 was renamed Perivale Halt. It closed permanently on 15 June 1947, in advance of the opening of the extension of the Central line from North Acton to Greenford on 30 June 1947.

== See also ==
- List of closed railway stations in London

Preceding station	National Rail	Following station
Greenford; Line closed- station open	Great Western Railway; New North Main Line	Twyford Abbey Halt (1904-1911); Brentham for North Ealing and Greystoke Park (1911-1947); Line and station closed
South Greenford; Line closed, station open	Great Western Railway; New North Main Line	Twyford Abbey Halt (1904-1911); Brentham for North Ealing and Greystoke Park (1911-1947); Line and station closed
