= West Acton tube station =

London Underground station

West Acton
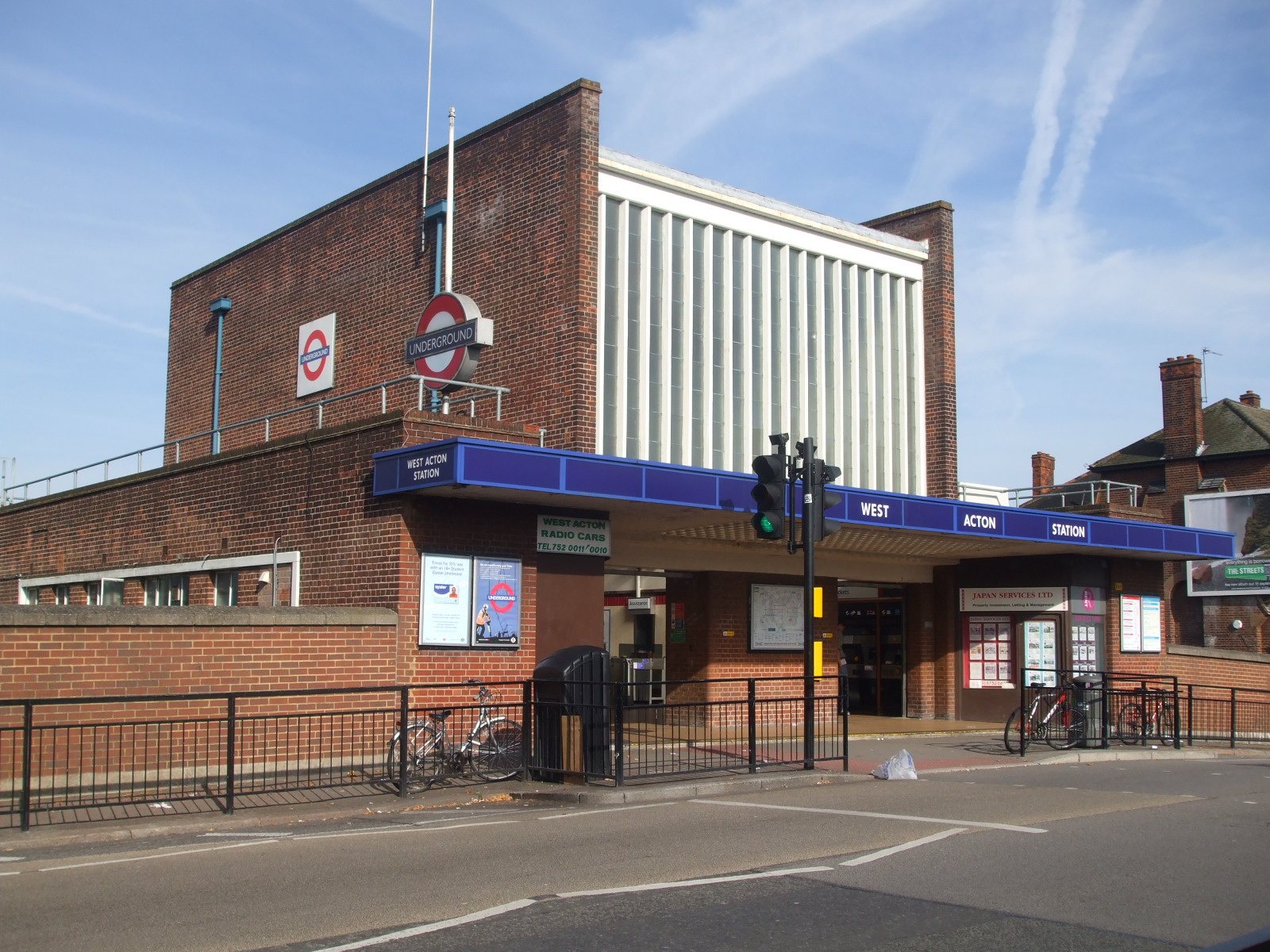
- Station building
- Interactive map of West Acton

General information
- Location: West Acton
- Local authority: London Borough of Ealing
- Managed by: London Underground
- Number of platforms: 2
- Fare zone: 3

London Underground annual entry and exit
- 2020: ▼0.84 million
- 2021: ▼0.71 million
- 2022: ▲1.10 million
- 2023: ▼1.06 million
- 2024: ▲1.11 million

Railway companies
- Original company: Great Western Railway

Key dates
- 5 November 1923: Station opened

Other information
- External links: TfL station info page
- Coordinates: 51.51806°N 0.28083°W

West Acton is a London Underground station in West Acton, London. It is on the Ealing Broadway branch of the Central line, between Ealing Broadway and North Acton stations. It is its only intermediate station in the branch. The station is a Grade II listed building. It is in London fare zone 3.

The station is close to North Ealing tube station on the Piccadilly line, 550 metres away at the western end of Queens Drive.

== History ==
As Transport for London explains:

On 18 August 1911, the Central London Railway abandoned its policy of no through running with any other railway, and secured powers to build a short extension from Wood Lane to connect with the intended Ealing & Shepherds Bush line of the Great Western Railway, over which it proposed to exercise running powers.

The Great Western Railway (GWR) built the Ealing Broadway branch (the western part of the former Ealing & Shepherd's Bush Railway) and opened it for freight trains in April 1917, and the Central London Railway trains used the line from 3 August 1920. West Acton and North Acton were built and owned by the GWR, and both opened on 5 November 1923.

GWR steam freight trains also ran through West Acton until 1938, when the London Underground tracks were segregated further east, through East Acton station, and to the west of North Acton station.

The current station, replacing the original building, was designed by the Great Western Railway, on behalf of London Transport, as part of the LPTB's 1935-40 New Works Programme improvements and extensions to the Central line. The design was by the GWR's architect Brian Lewis and it was completed by November 1940.

== Connections ==
London Buses route 218 serves the station.

Preceding station	London Underground	Following station
Ealing Broadway Terminus	Central line Ealing Broadway branch	North Acton towards Epping, Hainault or Woodford via Newbury Park
