= Twyford Abbey Halt railway station =

Former railway station in England

Twyford Abbey Halt
- Interactive map of Twyford Abbey Halt

General information
- Location: Park Royal
- Local authority: London Borough of Ealing
- Number of platforms: 2

Railway companies
- Original company: Great Western Railway
- Pre-grouping: Great Western Railway

Key dates
- 1 May 1904: Opened
- 1 May 1911: Closed
- Replaced by: Brentham for North Ealing and Greystoke Park

Other information
- Coordinates: 51°31′53.12″N 0°17′21.68″W

Twyford Abbey Halt was a short-lived railway station in Park Royal, Ealing, London on the New North Main Line and was located between Perivale Halt and Park Royal West Halt.

== History ==
It opened on 1 May 1904 and closed on 1 May 1911 when it was replaced by Brentham for North Ealing and Greystoke Park. The station was close to the location of the London Underground's Hanger Lane which opened in 1947.

Preceding station	Disused railways	Following station
Perivale Halt	Great Western Railway; New North Main Line	Park Royal
