= Northolt tube station =

London Underground station

Northolt
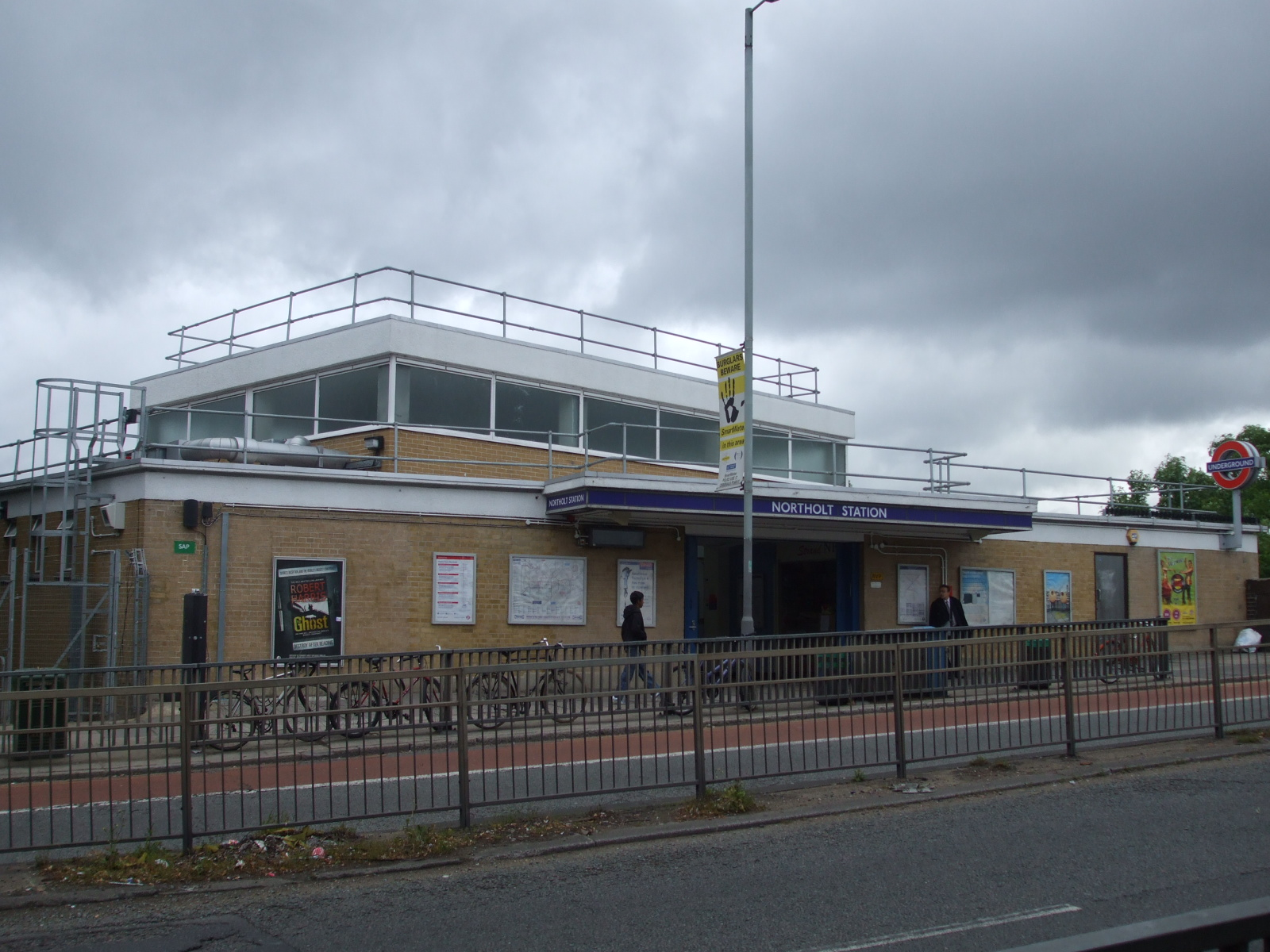
- Station entrance on Mandeville Road in July 2008
- Interactive map of Northolt

General information
- Location: Northolt
- Local authority: London Borough of Ealing
- Managed by: Transport for London
- Number of platforms: 2
- Accessible: Yes
- Fare zone: 5

London Underground annual entry and exit
- 2021: ▼2.47 million
- 2022: ▲3.96 million
- 2023: ▼3.94 million
- 2024: ▲4.10 million
- 2025: ▼4.05 million

Railway companies
- Original company: London Transport Executive

Key dates
- 21 November 1948: Station opened

Other information
- External links: TfL station info page
- Coordinates: 51.5480°N 0.3688°W

Northolt is a London Underground station, located in Northolt in the London Borough of Ealing. It is on the West Ruislip branch of the Central line, between South Ruislip and Greenford stations. It is in London fare zone 5.

== History ==
The Great Western Railway constructed a halt just to the east of this location named Northolt Halt in 1907, on their "New North Main Line" (now the Acton–Northolt line) to Birmingham. It was renamed Northolt (for West End) Halt, before gaining station status under its original shorter name. It was closed in 1948 when the Central line was extended on a new pair of tracks from North Acton, the current Northolt tube station opening on the opposite side of the road bridge on 21 November 1948. The opening had been planned to be in the 1930s but was delayed by World War II.

== The station today ==
The station has an island platform with passenger access down from the booking hall. Trains terminating at the station may use either a turnback siding west of the platforms to leave the running lines and run eastwards later or a crossover east of the station for more immediate return to central London.

In 2018, it was announced that the station would gain step-free access by 2022, as part of a £200 million investment to increase the number of accessible stations on the Tube. Work eventually began in February 2025 to install lifts and improve accessibility, with completion scheduled for summer 2026. This was completed in September 2026, with Northolt becoming the 95th Tube station with step-free access.

North of the Central line tracks there is the singled track of the Acton–Northolt line from Paddington which is now used by freight trains and previously a single daily passenger "parliamentary service" (operated by Chiltern Railways) between Paddington and Gerrards Cross. There are no longer any platforms on this line.

== Services ==
Northolt station is on the West Ruislip branch of the Central line in London fare zone 5. It is between South Ruislip to the west and Greenford to the east. The typical off-peak service on the Central line in trains per hour (tph) is:

- 9 tph westbound to West Ruislip
- 9 tph eastbound to Epping
- 3 tph eastbound to Loughton

| Preceding station | London Underground | Following station |
|---|---|---|
| South Ruislip towards West Ruislip | Central line West Ruislip branch | Greenford towards Epping, Hainault or Woodford via Newbury Park |
Disused railways
| South Ruislip | Great Western Railway; New North Main Line | Greenford |

== Transport links ==
London bus routes 90, 120, 140, 282, 395, E10, Superloop route SL9 and night route N7.
