= East Acton tube station =

London Underground station

East Acton
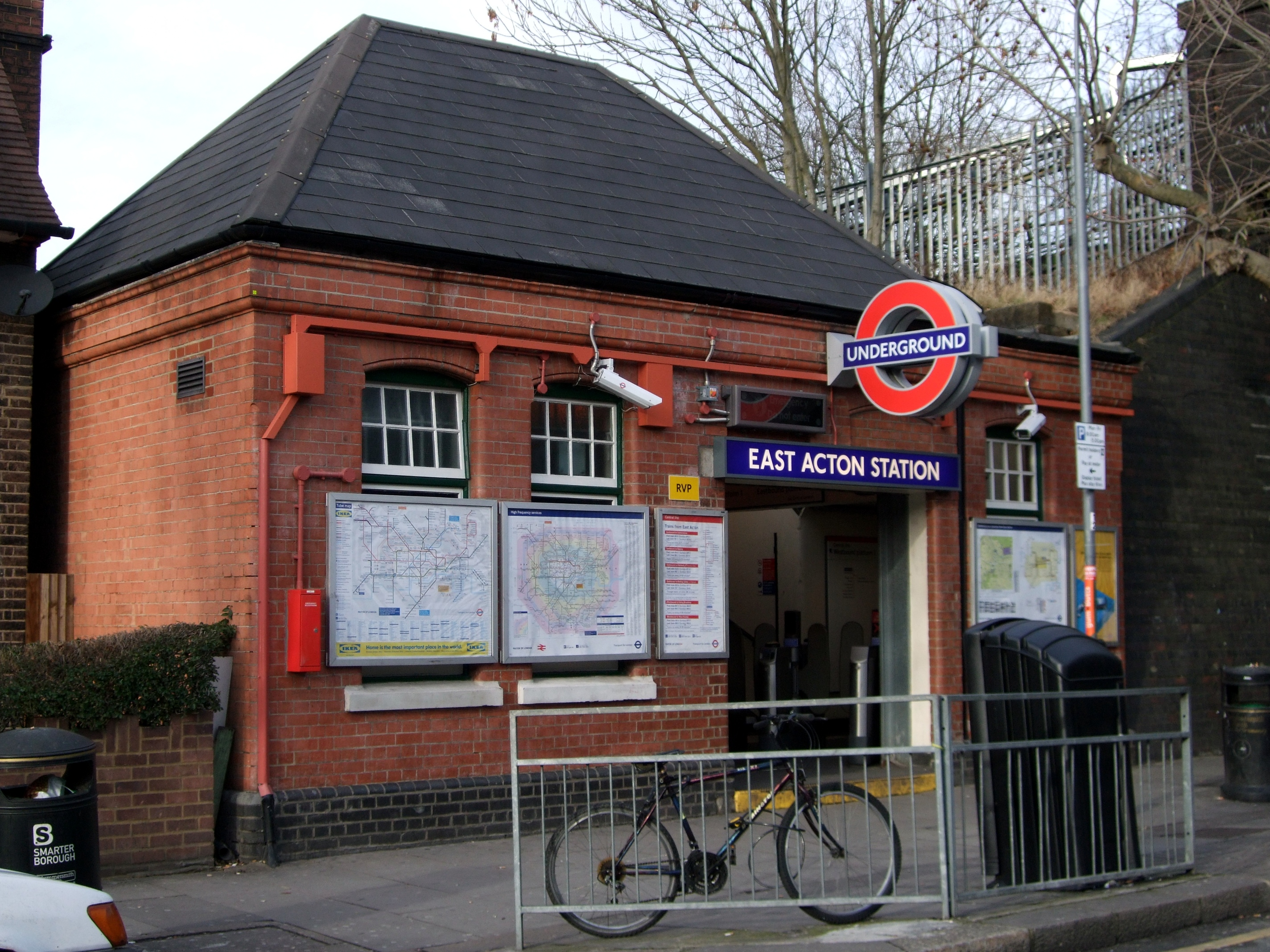
- East Acton station
- Interactive map of East Acton

General information
- Location: East Acton
- Local authority: Hammersmith & Fulham
- Managed by: London Underground
- Number of platforms: 2
- Fare zone: 2

London Underground annual entry and exit
- 2020: ▼2.73 million
- 2021: ▼1.33 million
- 2022: ▲2.71 million
- 2023: ▲3.13 million
- 2024: ▲3.69 million

Railway companies
- Original company: Great Western Railway
- Pre-grouping: Great Western Railway
- Post-grouping: Great Western Railway

Key dates
- 3 August 1920: Station opened

Other information
- External links: TfL station info page
- Coordinates: 51.51694°N 0.24750°W

East Acton is a London Underground station, located in East Acton in the London Borough of Hammersmith and Fulham. It is on the Central line between North Acton and White City stations, and is in London fare zone 2. Wormwood Scrubs, Queen Charlotte's and Chelsea Hospital, Hammersmith Hospital, Wormwood Scrubs prison and Imperial College Hammersmith branch are accessible from the station.

== Location ==
The station is located on Erconwald Street and is near the A40 Western Avenue connected via Old Oak Common Lane, 0.6 miles (0.97 km) from the centre of East Acton. Wormwood Scrubs, Queen Charlotte's and Chelsea Hospital, Hammersmith Hospital, HM Prison Wormwood Scrubs and Imperial College Hammersmith branch are accessible from the station.

== History ==
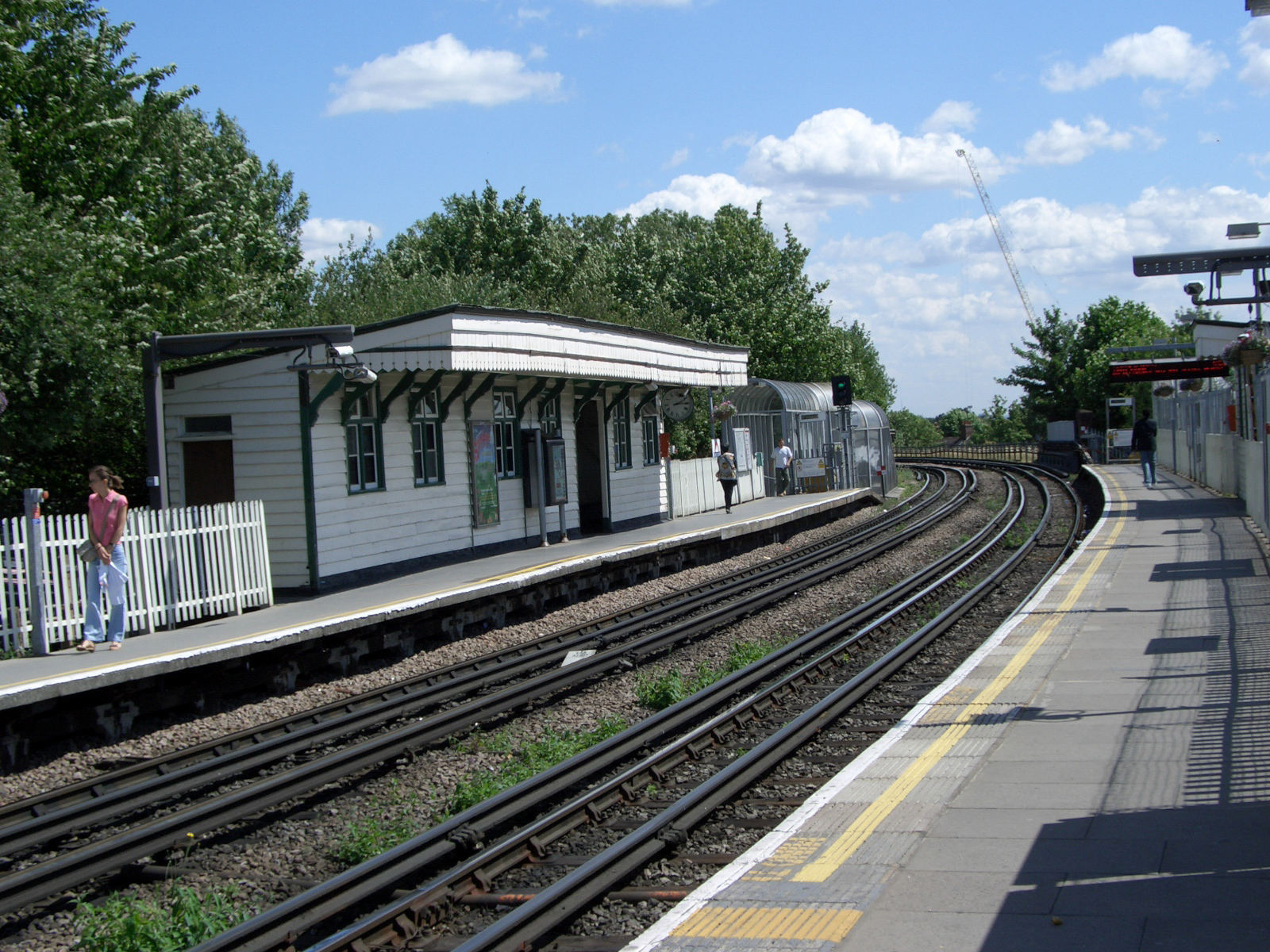
Looking east, with the eastbound platform shelter on the left.

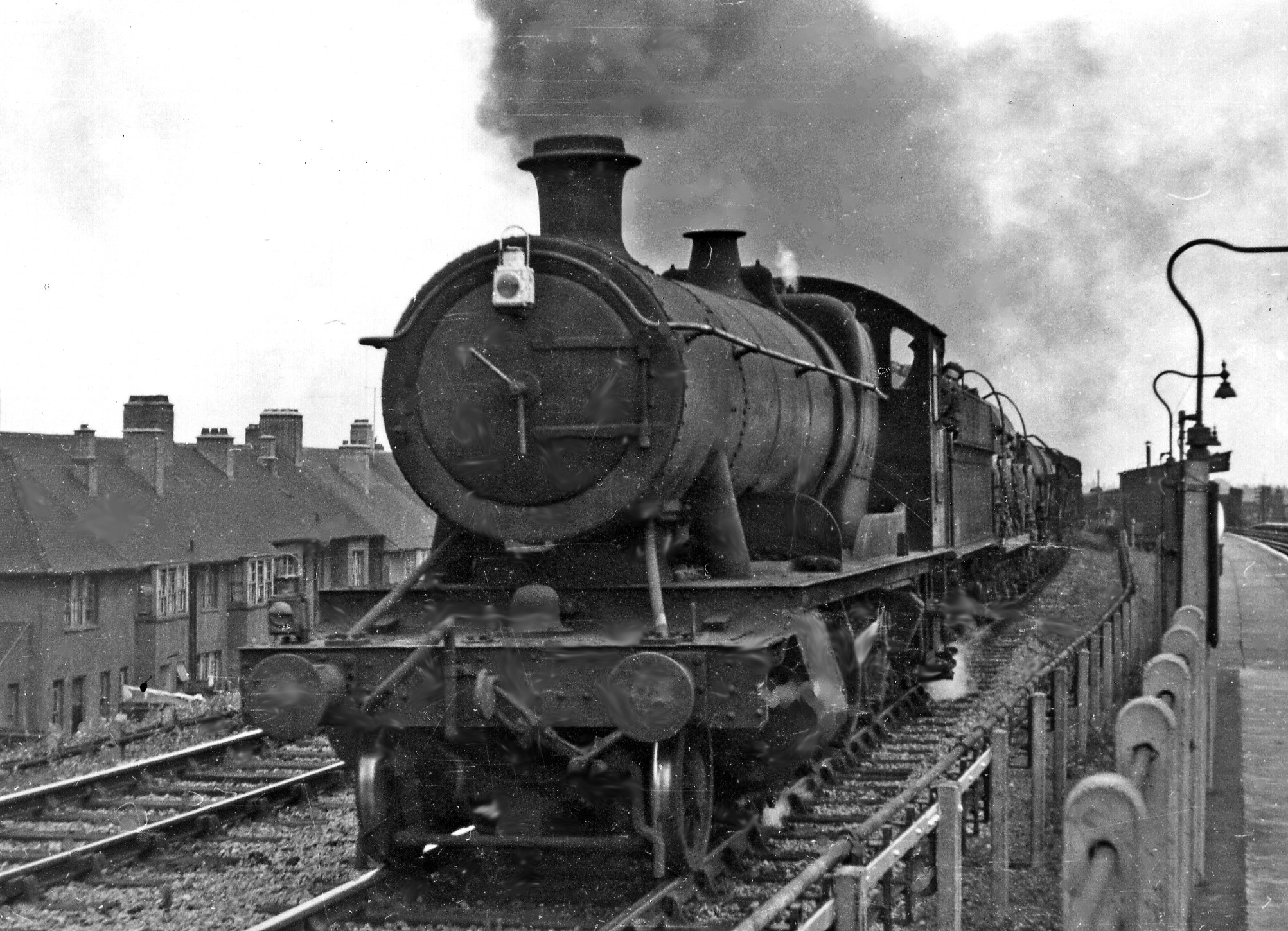
Down Milk empties passing East Acton on the GWR lines in 1949.

In 1905, the Great Western Railway (GWR) proposal to construct the Ealing & Shepherd's Bush Railway (E&SBR) so that it would connect its main line route at Ealing Broadway to the West London Railway (WLR) north of Shepherd's Bush was approved by Parliament. (Note: According to Transport for London (TfL), the Central London Railway abandoned its policy of through services not sharing tracks with any other railway from this proposal.) Construction had not started and in 1911, the Central London Railway (CLR, now part of the Central line) and GWR agreed running powers for CLR services to continue from Shepherd's Bush to Ealing Broadway using the GWR route. The CLR request for a short extension from Wood Lane to connect to the E&SBR tracks gained parliamentary approval on 18 August 1911 under the Central London Railway Act, 1911. The GWR constructed the new E&SBR line. (Note: The line opened as a steam-hauled freight only line on 16 April 1917.) Electrification of the track did not begin until after the end of the First World War. When complete, CLR services started on 3 August 1920 where East Acton was opened as the only intermediate station.

Since the CLR was exclusively a passenger service, two extra dedicated tracks for the GWR's freight trains were opened in 1938, but were closed in 1964. The trackbed of these rails is now overgrown with vegetation, visible immediately to the north of the station.

=== Improvements and closures ===
The tracks at East Acton were replaced in 2005 which saw a partial closure of the line from West Ruislip or Ealing Broadway to White City between 13 and 14 August 2005. In 2007, the station was refurbished by Metronet.

From August 2021, the eastbound platform was rebuilt. During the works eastbound Central line trains (towards central London) and all Night Tube trains did not stop at East Acton. Originally planned to last five months until December 2021, it was discovered that structural elements required full replacement rather than repair and the platforms did not reopen until 19 September 2022.

== Services ==
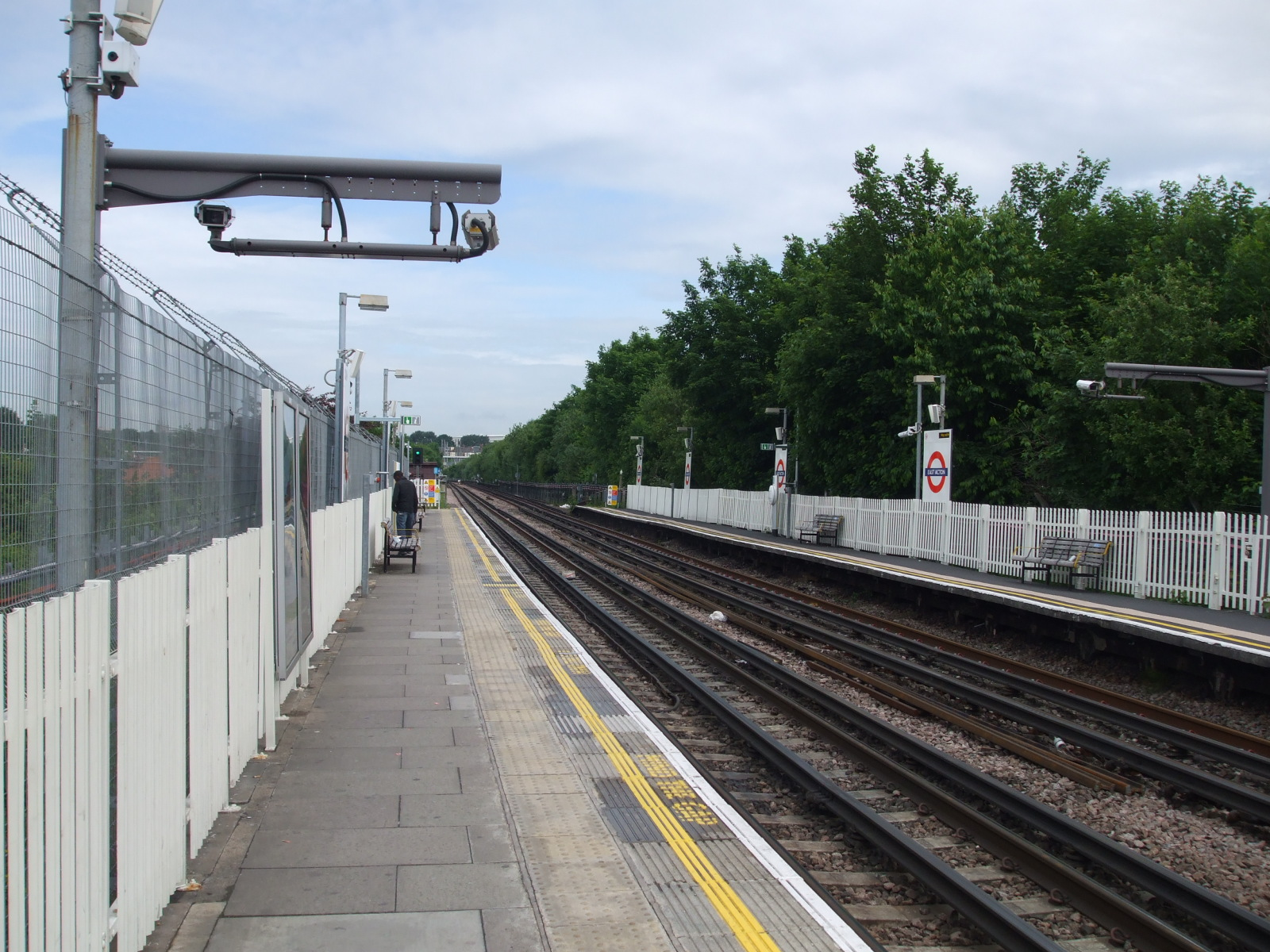
Looking west. The vegetation marks the alignment of the ex-GWR tracks, lifted many years ago

East Acton station is on the Central line in London fare zone 2. It is between North Acton to the west and White City to the east. To the east, the two tracks change direction to continue to White City.

The typical off-peak service in trains per hour (tph) is:

- 9 tph eastbound to Epping
- 3 tph eastbound to Loughton
- 6 tph eastbound to Hainault via Newbury Park
- 3 tph eastbound to Woodford via Hainault
- 9 tph westbound to West Ruislip
- 3 tph westbound to Northolt
- 9 tph westbound to Ealing Broadway

Night Tube services also serve the station, with a frequency of 3 tph in both directions.

Preceding station	London Underground	Following station
North Acton towards Ealing Broadway or West Ruislip	Central line	White City towards Epping, Hainault or Woodford via Newbury Park
Former route
Ealing Broadway Terminus	Central line (1920–1923)	Wood Lane towards Liverpool Street
North Acton towards Ealing Broadway	Central line (1923–1946)	Wood Lane towards Liverpool Street
North Acton towards Ealing Broadway	Central line (1946–1947)	Wood Lane towards Stratford
North Acton towards Ealing Broadway	Central line (1947–1947)	Wood Lane towards Leytonstone
North Acton towards Ealing Broadway or Greenford	Central line (1947–1947)	Wood Lane towards Leytonstone
Service arrangement if Old Oak Common station is constructed
Old Oak Common towards Ealing Broadway or West Ruislip	Central line	White City towards Epping, Hainault or Woodford via Newbury Park

== Connections ==
London Buses routes 7, 70, 72, 95, 228, 260 and 272 and night route N7 serve the station.

== Notes and references ==
=== Bibliography ===
- Bruce, J Graeme; Croome, Desmond F (2006) [1996]. The Central Line. Capital Transport. ISBN 1-85414-297-6.
- Rose, Douglas (1999) [1980]. The London Underground, A Diagrammatic History. Douglas Rose/Capital Transport. ISBN 1-85414-219-4.
- Day, John R; Reed, John (2008) [1963]. The Story of London's Underground. Capital Transport. ISBN 978-1-85414-316-7.
