= Park Royal railway station =

Former railway station in London, England

Park Royal
- Location of Park Royal in Greater London
- Location: Park Royal
- Local authority: London Borough of Ealing
- Number of platforms: 2

Railway companies
- Original company: Great Western Railway
- Pre-grouping: Great Western Railway
- Post-grouping: Great Western Railway

Key dates
- 15 June 1903: Opened
- 5 July 1903: Closed
- 1 May 1904: Opened
- 1 February 1915: closed
- 29 March 1920: opened
- 27 September 1937: Closed
- Replaced by: None

Other information
- Coordinates: 51.5272°N 0.2766°W

Park Royal was a railway station in Park Royal, London. It was opened by the Great Western Railway temporarily between 15 June 1903 and 5 July 1903 to serve an exhibition at the Royal Agricultural Showground at Park Royal services ran from Paddington to Ealing Broadway station via the Greenford loop at which time it was the only station on the line. The station opened again on 1 May 1904 when services on New North Main Line began. It closed on 27 September 1937 following the opening of Park Royal West Halt along the line to the north-west in 1932.

== See also ==
- London Underground
- Great Western Railway

Preceding station	Disused railways	Following station
West Ealing	Great Western Railway; Greenford Loop (1903)	Westbourne Park
Twyford Abbey Halt	Great Western Railway; New North Main Line (1904-11)	North Acton
Brentham	Great Western Railway; New North Main Line (1911-47)	North Acton
Park Royal West Halt	Great Western Railway; New North Main Line (1932-47)	North Acton
