= First Bus =

First Bus can mean:

- New World First Bus, third largest bus operator in Hong Kong
- FirstBus, a United Kingdom bus company that was renamed FirstGroup in 1998
- First Bus, a United Kingdom mid-level holding company and national trademark of FirstGroup
- Carrosses à cinq sols, the first public bus
