= North Acton =

Area of Acton, London, England

Coordinates: 51.528023°N 0.257668°W

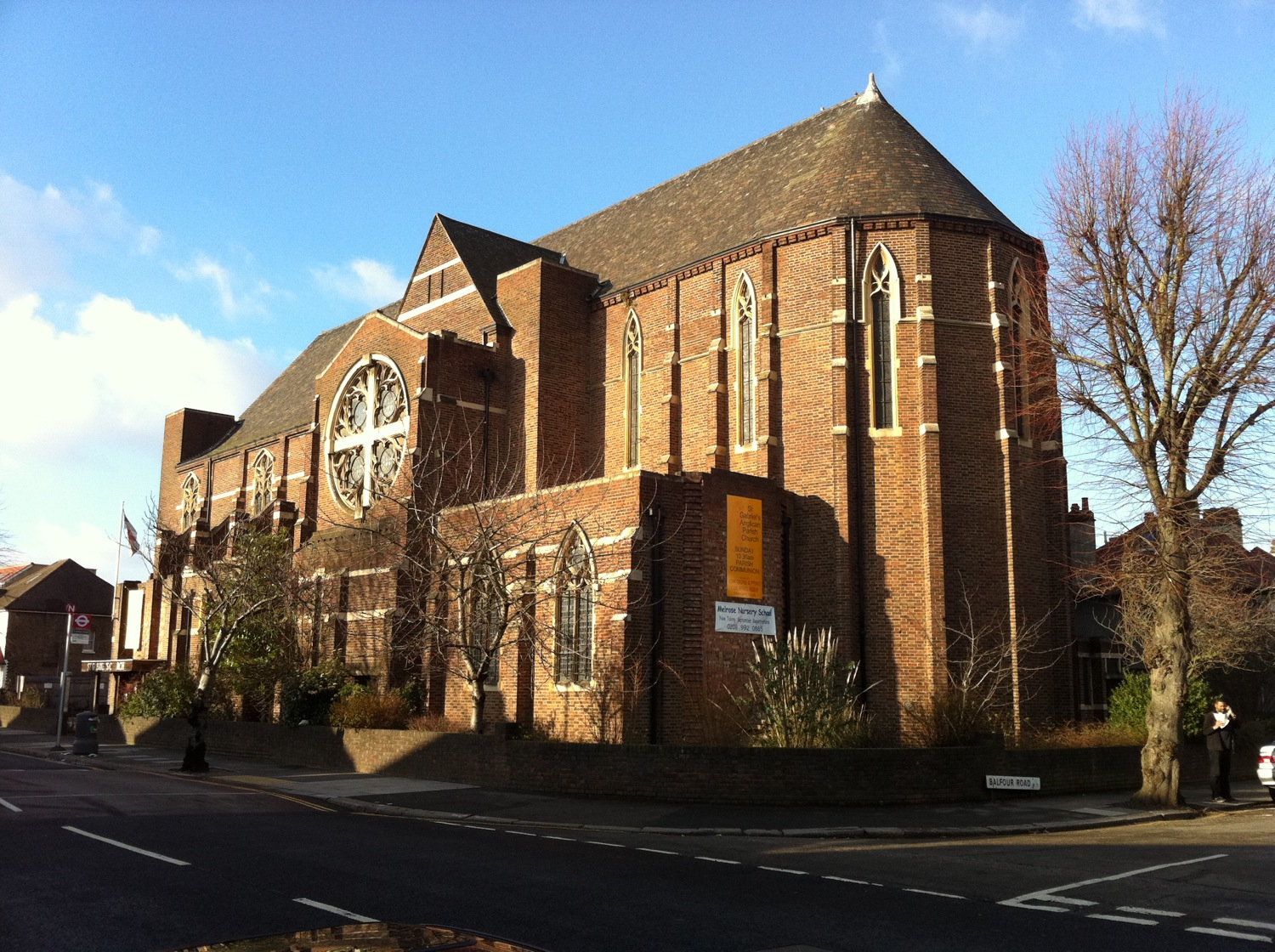
- St Gabriel's Church, the parish church of North Acton.

- Location within Greater London
- OS grid reference: TQ205805
- London borough: Ealing
- Ceremonial county: Greater London
- Region: London
- Country: England
- Sovereign state: United Kingdom
- Post town: LONDON
- Postcode district: W3
- Postcode district: NW10
- Dialling code: 020
- Police: Metropolitan
- Fire: London
- Ambulance: London
- UK Parliament: Ealing Central and Acton
- London Assembly: Ealing and Hillingdon

North Acton is a part of Acton in west London, and is within the London Borough of Ealing. It runs adjacent to the industrial district of Park Royal. Historically part of the Municipal Borough of Acton in the county of Middlesex, it has formed part of the London Borough of Ealing since 1965.

It is primarily within the London W3 postal district, although the northern, mainly industrial part of the area is covered by NW10 and overlaps with neighbouring Park Royal, essentially as a satellite region. Park Royal, which is heavily associated with North Acton, and forms part of the same ecclesiastical parish, falls under the NW10 postcode area. Its Church of England parish church is St Gabriel's Church, North Acton.

== Governance ==
North Acton is part of the Ealing Central and Acton constituency for elections to the House of Commons of the United Kingdom. Rupa Huq has been the local Labour MP since 2015 general election. North Acton is part of the North Acton ward for elections to Ealing London Borough Council.

== Commercial activity ==
The commercial district of Park Royal overspills into North Acton, and several facilities are located on the edge of North Acton Playing Fields, including the Black Island Film Studios. North Acton is also the home to the Boden clothes brand. In recent years there has been new commercial and high-rise residential redevelopment to the south of North Acton tube station, including extensive provision of student accommodation for the University of the Arts and Imperial College London.

== BBC ==
The BBC has been associated with North Acton for many decades, with its main television rehearsal studios and its costume collection located in North Acton for many years in the late 20th century, adjacent to the railway station. There is a short and easy journey of just two stops on the Central line to reach White City and the Television Centre (TVC) there. Many famous actors and producers have utilised the rehearsal studios, and North Acton public house 'The Castle' opposite, where actors frequently gathered for lunch and refreshments. Following a decision by the BBC to relocate services, the rehearsal studios have closed, and the Television Centre itself also closed in 2013. The costume collection building has closed and been demolished with a new tower block of student accommodation (for the University of the Arts) opening on the site late in 2012. The student block has been named "The Costume Store" in tribute to the former BBC activity on the site.

The last remaining BBC facility in North Acton today is the "BBC Park Western" studios and office block, located on Kendall Avenue, beside the Central line, midway between North Acton and West Acton tube stations. Once the headquarters of the BBC TV Outside Broadcasting Department, half the site has now been sold and redeveloped, with the remaining BBC Park Western used as the operating base, standing set, and production offices for popular television series Silent Witness, much of which is filmed around Acton and Park Royal.

== Public spaces ==
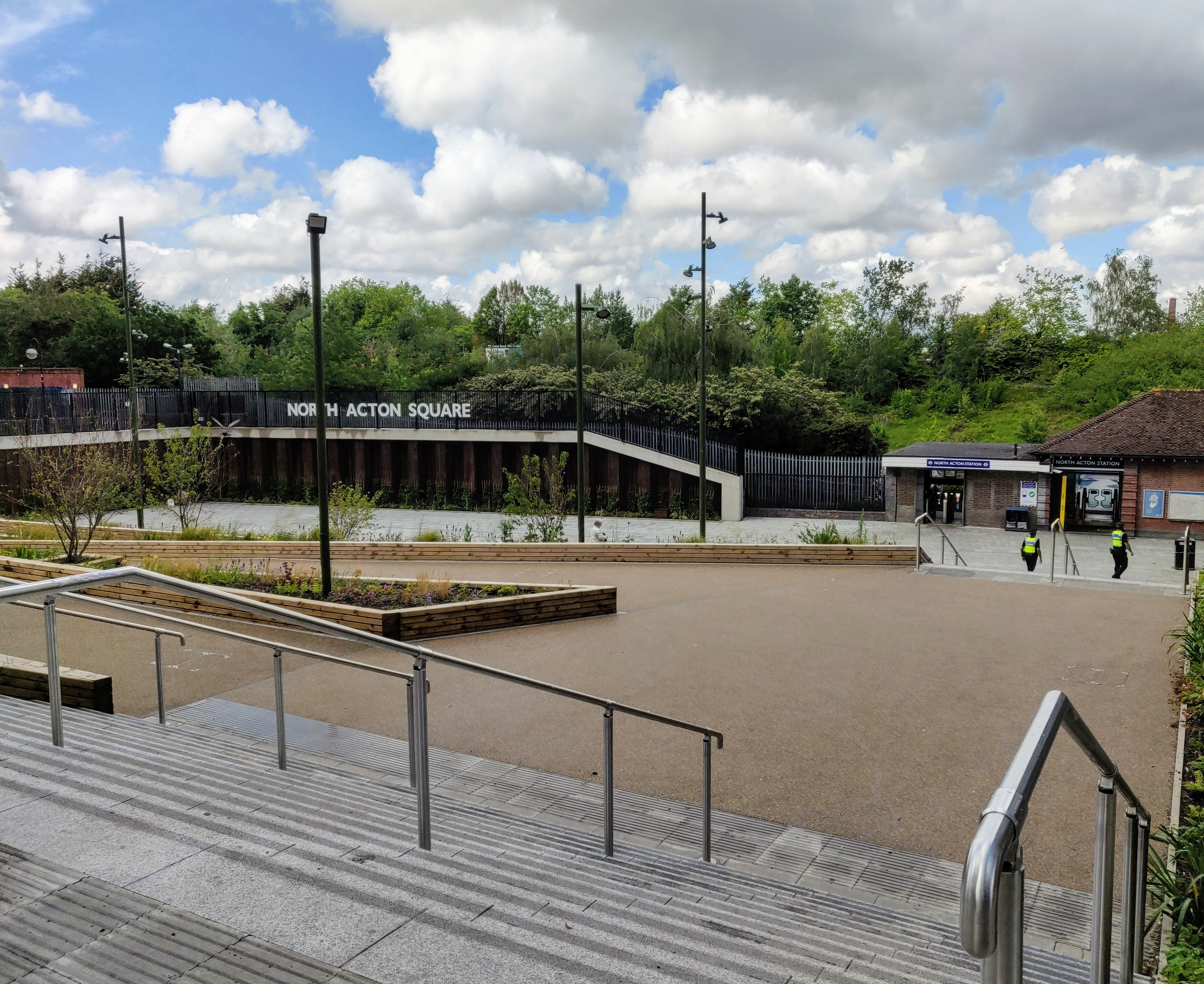
North Acton Square in front of the tube station

North Acton Playing Fields is a large open space for public recreation. Its facilities include several football and cricket pitches, multiple hard-surfaced and grass tennis courts, a basketball court, exercise machines forming a public 'outside gym', a pavilion, a children's playground, hard (tarmac) surfaced paths for walking in inclement weather, a picnic area with metal picnic tables, and designated dog-walking areas. In 2020, North Acton Square opened between Victoria Road and North Acton tube station, as part of a redevelopment of the area and to raise the profile of the transport hub.

== Transport ==
=== Tube & Rail ===
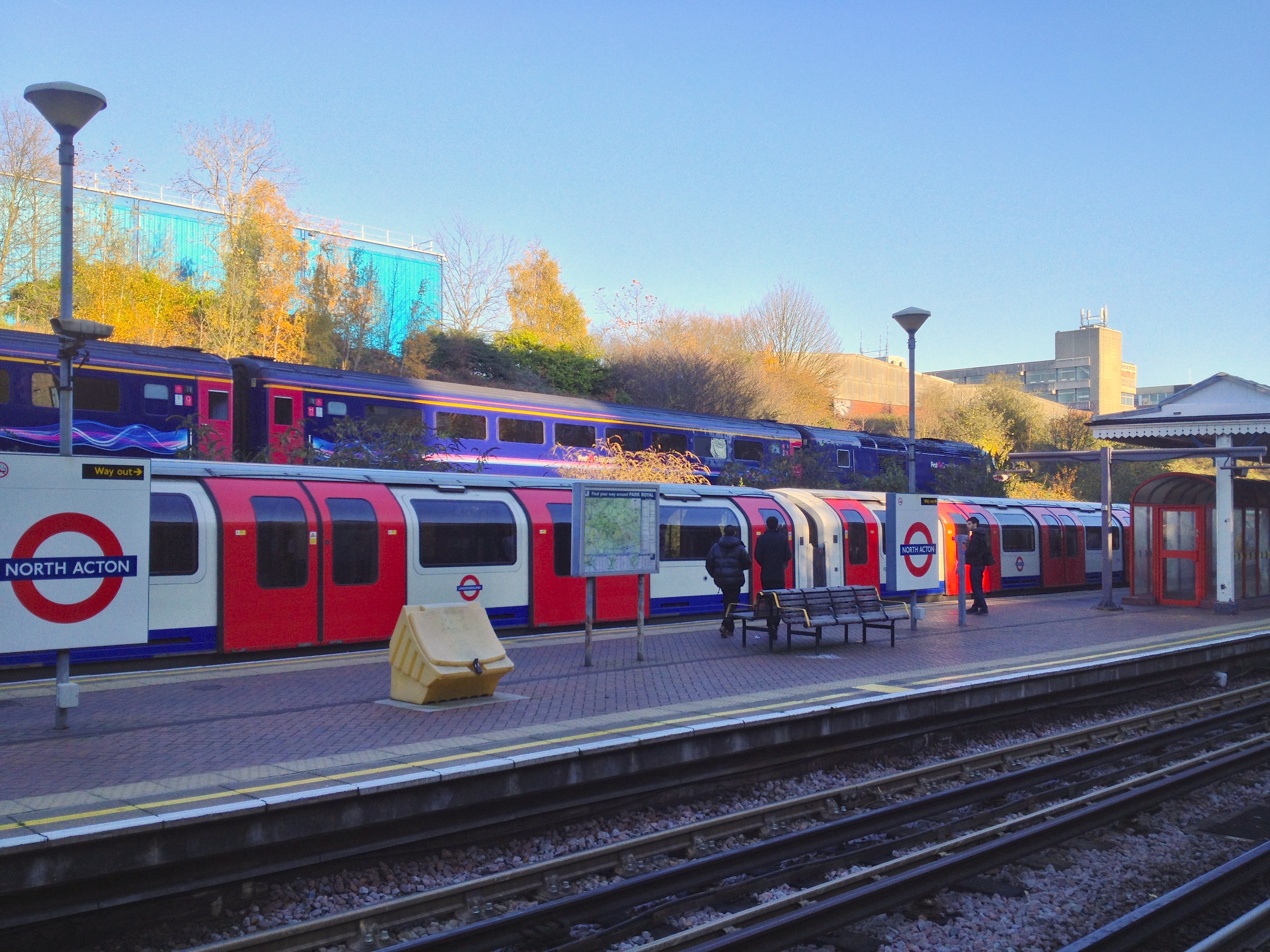
The railway station at North Acton. The visible lines are platforms 1, 2, and 3 (one with a train) of the Central line. Beyond is a High Speed Train passing through the Network Rail (national railway) line.

The main tube station is North Acton on the Central line (in fare zones 2 and 3), although several other stations are within easy walking distance of the community. The Central line splits to the west of North Acton station — one branch going to Ealing Broadway and the other to West Ruislip.

North Acton is also served by Elizabeth line trains, which stop at Acton Main Line station.

=== Buses ===
London Buses serving North Acton are:

Route	Start	End	Operator
95	Southall	Shepherd's Bush	Metroline
218	North Acton station	Hammersmith	First Bus
260	White City	Golders Green	Metroline
266	Acton Old Town Hall	Brent Cross	Metroline
440	Stonebridge Park station	Chiswick	London United
487	South Harrow	Willesden Junction station	Metroline

== Neighbouring places ==
- Park Royal
- Acton
- Ealing
- Shepherd's Bush
- Harlesden
- South Acton
- East Acton
- West Acton
