= West Acton =

Coordinates: 51.522519°N 0.272668°W

- Location within Greater London
- OS grid reference: TQ205805
- London borough: Ealing
- Ceremonial county: Greater London
- Region: London
- Country: England
- Sovereign state: United Kingdom
- Post town: LONDON
- Postcode district: W3
- Dialling code: 020
- Police: Metropolitan
- Fire: London
- Ambulance: London
- UK Parliament: Ealing Central and Acton
- London Assembly: Ealing and Hillingdon

West Acton is a place in West London, England. It is part of Acton, in the London Borough of Ealing.

The area includes Hanger Hill Garden Estate conservation area, which has many houses built in the mock Tudor style.

== Transport ==
- West Acton Station (Central line)

== Neighbouring places ==
- Park Royal
- Acton
- Ealing
- Shepherd's Bush
