= Hanger Lane tube station =

London Underground station

Hanger Lane
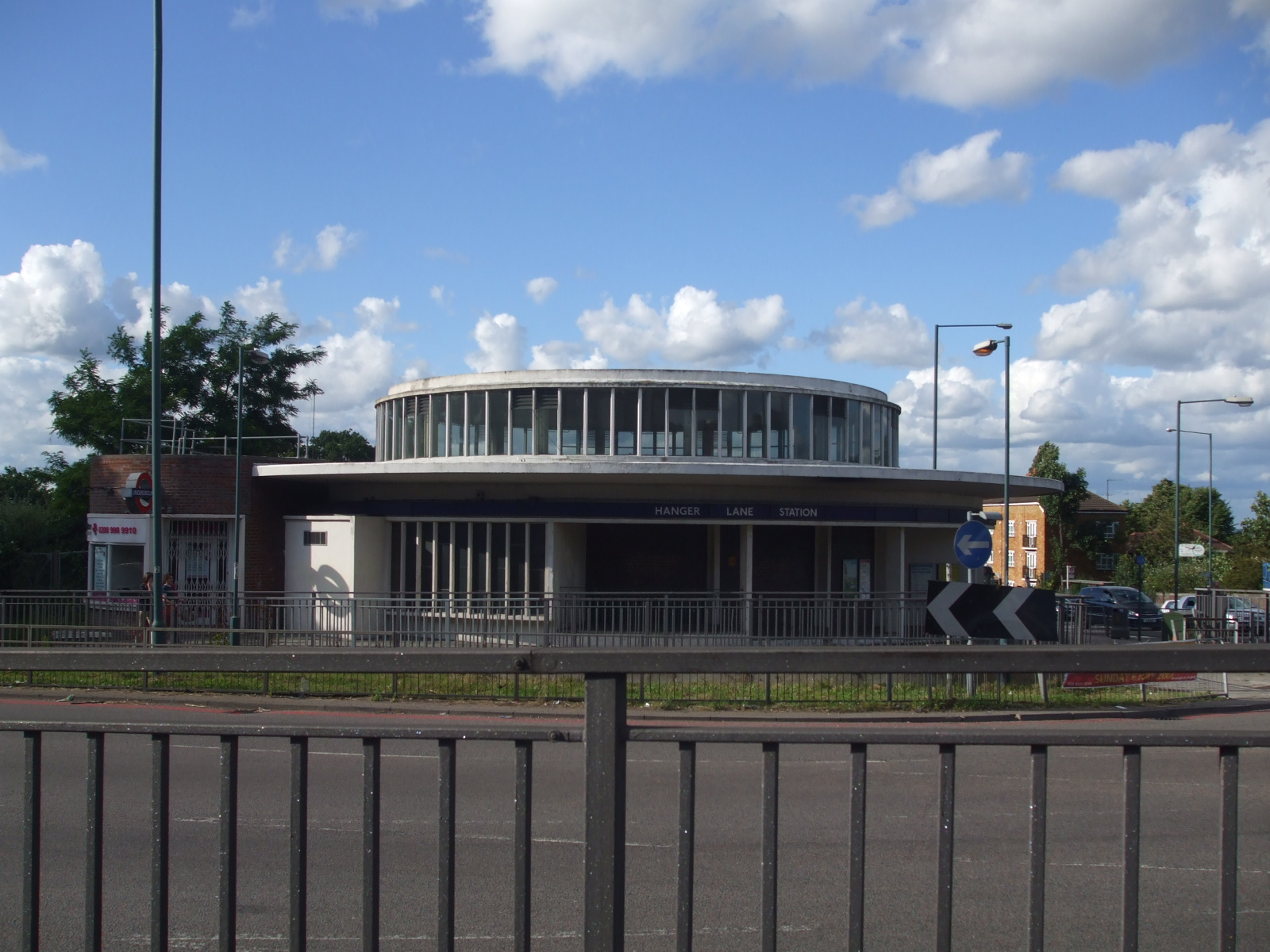
- Station building
- Interactive map of Hanger Lane

General information
- Location: Hanger Hill
- Local authority: London Borough of Ealing
- Managed by: London Underground
- Number of platforms: 2
- Fare zone: 3
- OSI: Park Royal

London Underground annual entry and exit
- 2020: ▼1.90 million
- 2021: ▼1.47 million
- 2022: ▲2.58 million
- 2023: ▼2.55 million
- 2024: ▲2.89 million

Key dates
- 30 June 1947: Opened

Other information
- External links: TfL station info page
- Coordinates: 51.530278°N 0.293056°W

Hanger Lane (/ˈhæŋər ˈleɪn/) is a London Underground station in Hanger Hill, Ealing. It is located on the border between west and north-west London. The station is on the West Ruislip branch of the Central line, between Perivale and North Acton stations. It is in London fare zone 3.

Hanger Lane is within walking distance from Park Royal tube station on the Piccadilly line. The two lines cross a little east of the station.

== History ==
The Great Western Railway (GWR) opened Twyford Abbey Halt just east of the site on 1 May 1904 as part of the GWR and Great Central Railway Joint Railway project (the New North Main Line) towards High Wycombe. It was closed on 1 May 1911, replaced by Brentham station to the west of the present location. That station was closed between 1915 and 1920 due to World War I economies. Brentham and most main-line stations between North Acton and West Ruislip were finally closed in 1947 when the Central line was extended from North Acton on electrified tracks built under the LPTB New Works Programme of 1935; the delay was due to World War II.

The Central line station opened on 30 June 1947 as "Hanger Lane" as it was near that road.

The entrance and roof of the subsurface ticket hall form the centre of the Hanger Lane Gyratory System, a complex roundabout in West London where the A40 Western Avenue crosses the A406 North Circular Road in an underpass. Passengers must use pedestrian subways under the gyratory to access the station, which is itself above ground.

In 2012 the station building exterior was repainted, refurbished and given new London Underground roundels.

In 2018, it was announced that the station would gain step-free access by 2022, as part of a £200m investment to increase the number of accessible stations on the Tube. Work on the scheme began in March 2025, with upgrades including a new footbridge, lift access to the platforms, and a refurbished accessible toilet. The project is scheduled for completion in summer 2026.

== Development ==
In 2004 the multinational Diageo company agreed to build platforms to the east for an interchange with Park Royal on the Piccadilly line, as part of its First Central business park, built on the site of the (now demolished) Guinness brewery. As of June 2026, this has not happened.

== Connections ==
A number of London Buses routes serve the station.

Preceding station	London Underground	Following station
Perivale towards West Ruislip	Central line West Ruislip branch	North Acton towards Epping, Hainault or Woodford via Newbury Park
