= North Acton tube station =

London Underground station

North Acton
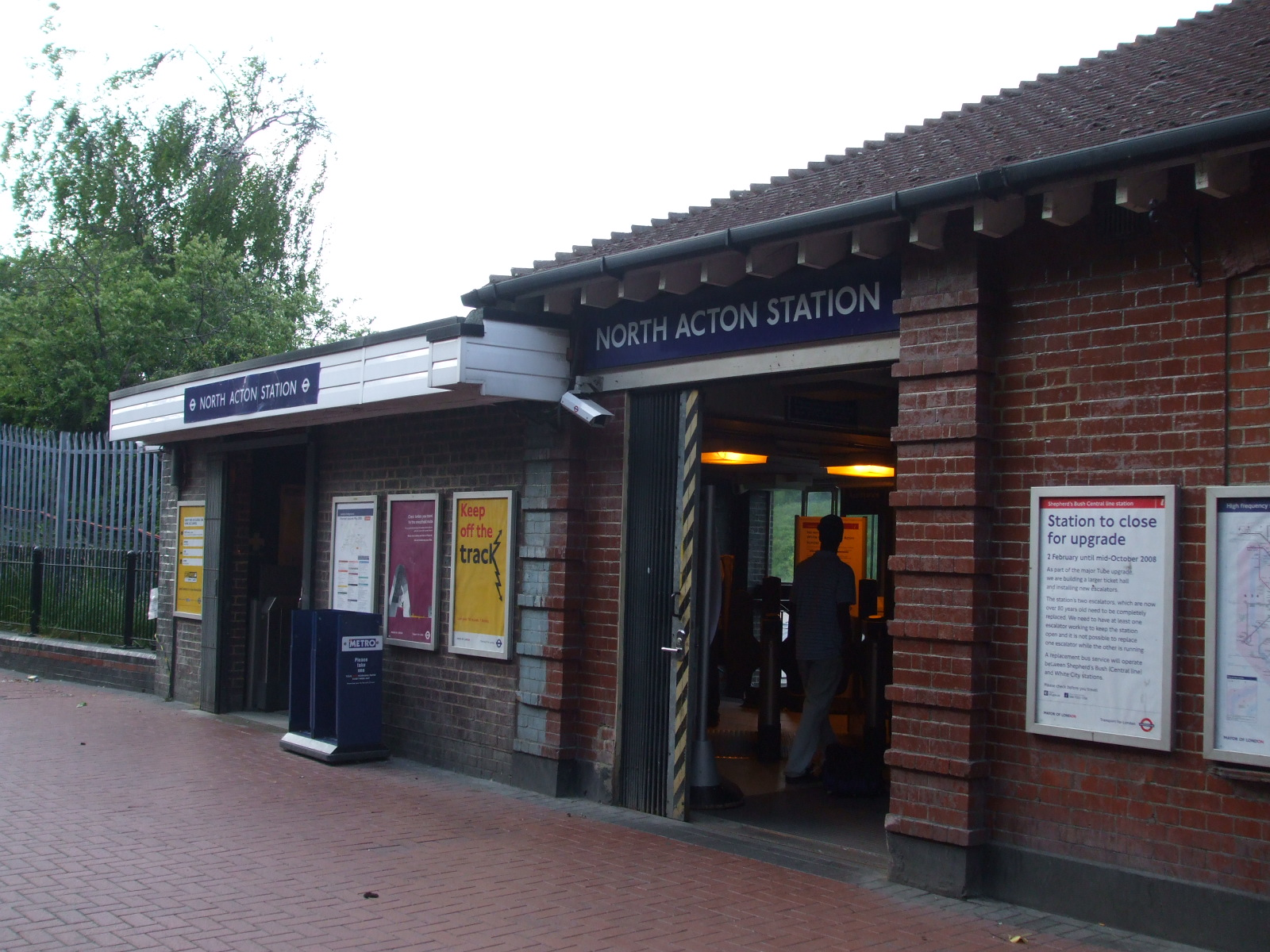
- Station entrance
- Interactive map of North Acton

General information
- Location: North Acton
- Local authority: London Borough of Ealing
- Managed by: London Underground
- Number of platforms: 3
- Fare zone: 2 and 3

London Underground annual entry and exit
- 2020: ▼3.72 million
- 2021: ▼3.15 million
- 2022: ▲5.23 million
- 2023: ▲5.65 million
- 2024: ▲6.11 million

Key dates
- 5 November 1923: Opened

Other information
- External links: TfL station info page
- Coordinates: 51.52361°N 0.25972°W

North Acton is a London Underground station in North Acton in the London Borough of Ealing. It is on the Central line, between Hanger Lane (on the West Ruislip branch) or West Acton (on the Ealing Broadway branch) and East Acton stations. The station is on the boundary of London fare zone 2 and zone 3.

== History ==
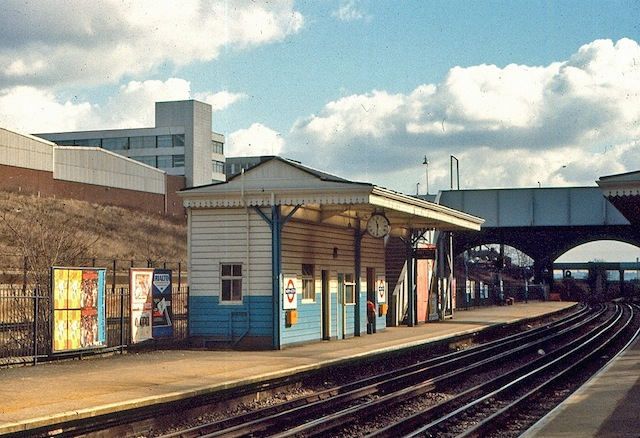
North Acton station facing east in March 1979, showing the old waiting room and only two Central line tracks

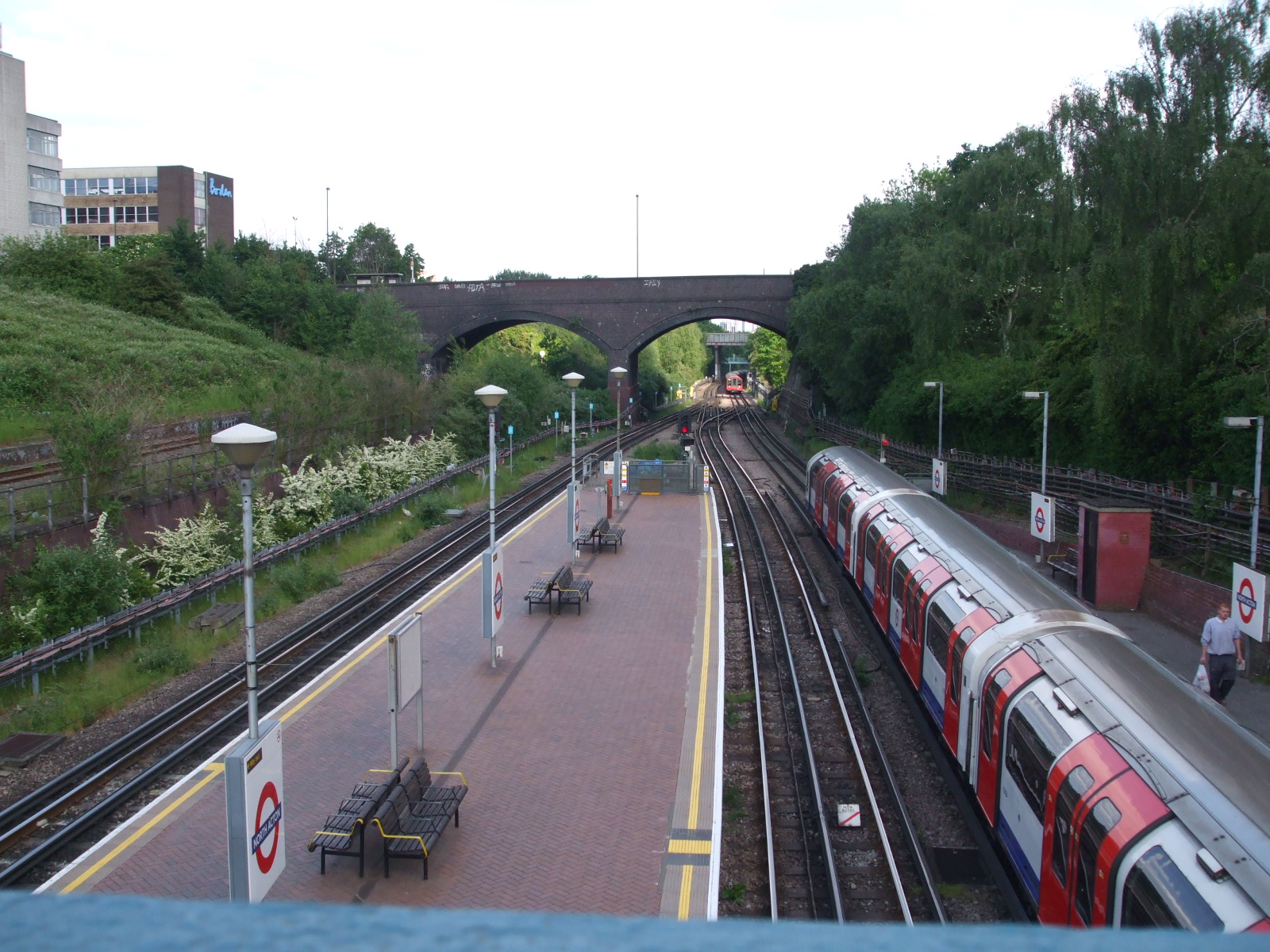
Facing east in May 2008. Tracks from the left were once two of the NNML, two GWR freight and two Central line track beds. The closer bridge carries Victoria Road; that beyond carries the North London Line.

The joint "New North Main Line" (NNML; the present day Acton–Northolt line) of the Great Central and Great Western opened in 1903 and its North Acton Halt railway station followed in 1904, though it was closed by 1913. The Great Western Railway (GWR) built the Ealing & Shepherd's Bush Railway, which connected the Central London Railway (CLR) with the GWR's Ealing Broadway station. CLR trains began using the route on 3 August 1920. The stations at North Acton and West Acton were built and owned by the GWR, and both opened on 5 November 1923, the new North Acton being a short distance east of the 1904 halt. As Transport for London explains:

On 18 August 1911, the Central London Railway abandoned its policy of no through running with any other railway, and secured powers to build a short extension from Wood Lane to connect with the intended Ealing & Shepherds Bush line of the Great Western Railway, over which it proposed to exercise running powers.

North of the Central line tracks were two freight lines, removed in the 1960s, running alongside the Central line as far as White City; to the north of those at a slightly higher level were the two tracks of the NNML The NNML platforms closed when the Central line was extended on new track from North Acton to Greenford station in 1947. Today, only the outer-most NNML platform remains partially intact, having been removed in the early 1950s.

Between South Ruislip station and Old Oak Junction, the GWR line was progressively run down, and in many places it is now single-track, including the stretch running past North Acton, which was reduced to single-track in 1993. From May 2008 until December 2018 only freight trains and a once-daily passenger service provided by Chiltern Railways used this stretch of line.

The Underground station had only two platforms until 1992, whereby for operational flexibility an island platform was created by building a third platform north of the other two, where the old freight line track bed had been. The third platform became the eastbound road while the eastbound platform (now the middle platform) was resignalled to allow it to be used also for terminating and starting services. This change allows shuttle services to be run to White City from Ealing Broadway and from West Ruislip in the event of problems elsewhere on the Central line, and at certain times of the day some trains coming from central London are scheduled to terminate at North Acton.

== Development ==
There have been vague and uncosted suggestions over the years to move the station to the east to provide an interchange with the North London Line. This would, however, be in an area with no extra passenger generation, and merely to move the station for interchange purposes has never been sufficient reason. The idea was revived in February 2008, when the Greater London Authority stated in a 'Park Royal draft Opportunity Area Planning Framework' that

There may be potential for an interchange between the Central line and North London Line at North Acton. This is purely aspirational at this stage, and would require investigation to determine cost, finance and feasibility.

In 2004, the multinational Diageo company agreed to build Central line platforms at Park Royal station to the west of North Acton, as part of its First Central business park, built on the site of the now demolished Guinness brewery. By 2017 this had not yet happened. Such a new station might influence whether adjacent stations were ever moved (particularly Hanger Lane station not far to the west). The entrance to a 'North London Line' North Acton station could be just a few metres on the other side of Victoria Road from the current North Acton station eastern entrance. There is a footpath to the west immediately next to the railway, from nearby Chase Road to Park Royal Road.

== Connections ==
London Buses routes 95, 218, 260, 266, 440, 487 and N266 serve the station.

Preceding station	London Underground	Following station
Hanger Lane towards West Ruislip	Central line	East Acton towards Epping, Hainault or Woodford via Newbury Park
West Acton towards Ealing Broadway	Central line	East Acton towards Epping, Hainault or Woodford via Newbury Park
Service arrangement if Old Oak Common opens
Hanger Lane towards West Ruislip	Central line	Old Oak Common towards Epping, Hainault or Woodford via Newbury Park
West Acton towards Ealing Broadway	Central line	Old Oak Common towards Epping, Hainault or Woodford via Newbury Park
Disused railways
Park Royal	Great Western Railway; New North Main Line	Old Oak Lane Halt
