= Acton–Northolt line =

Railway line in West London

Coordinates: 51°32′7″N 0°19′4″W

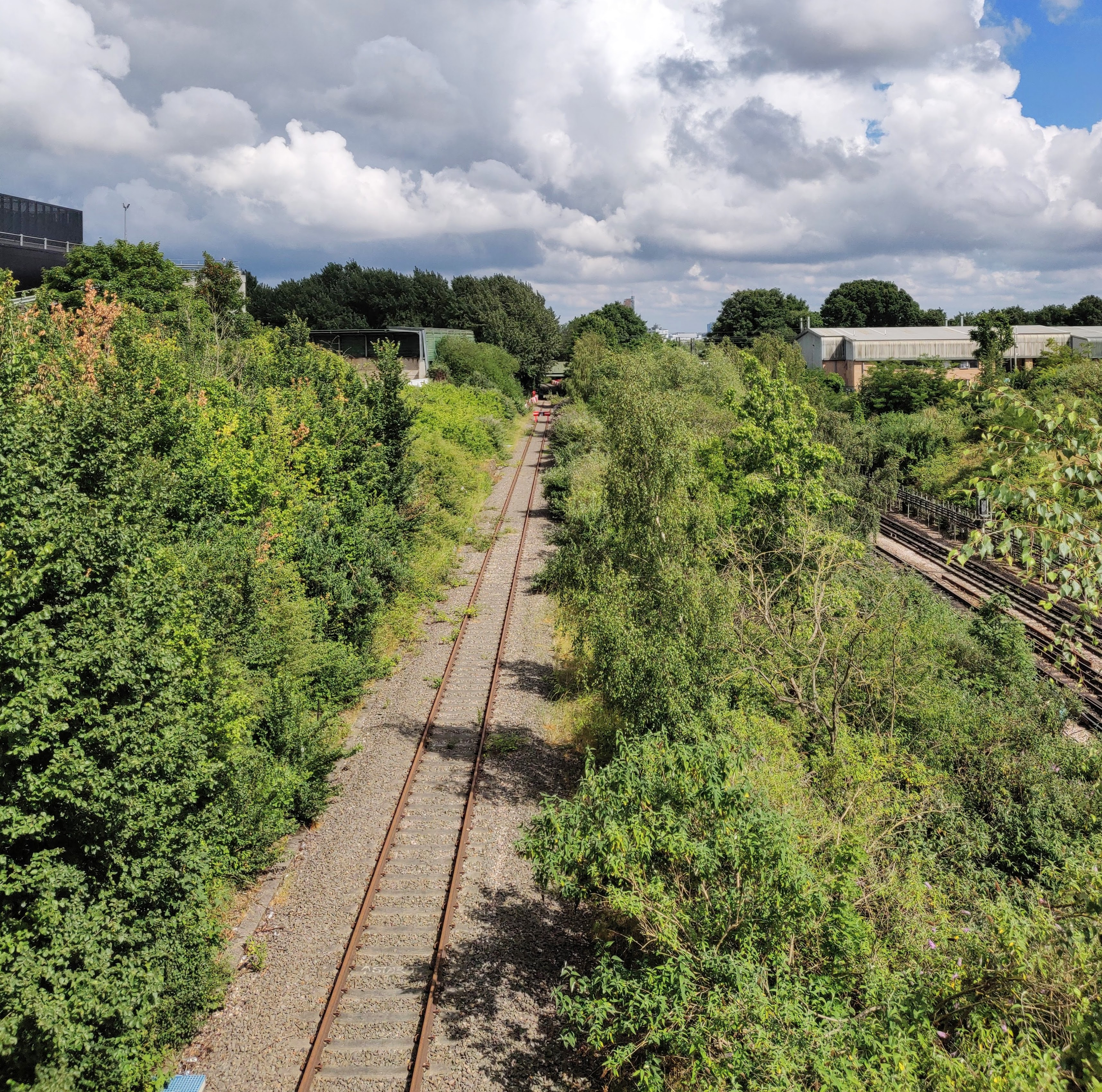
- End of the line near North Acton, curtailed for HS2 works. Photo view from Victoria Road bridge in June 2020

Overview
- Status: Partially operational
- Owner: Network Rail
- Locale: Greater London
- Stations: None open

Service
- Type: Suburban rail
- System: National Rail

History
- Opened: 1903

Technical
- Track gauge: 4 ft 8 1/2 in (1,435 mm) standard gauge
Route map
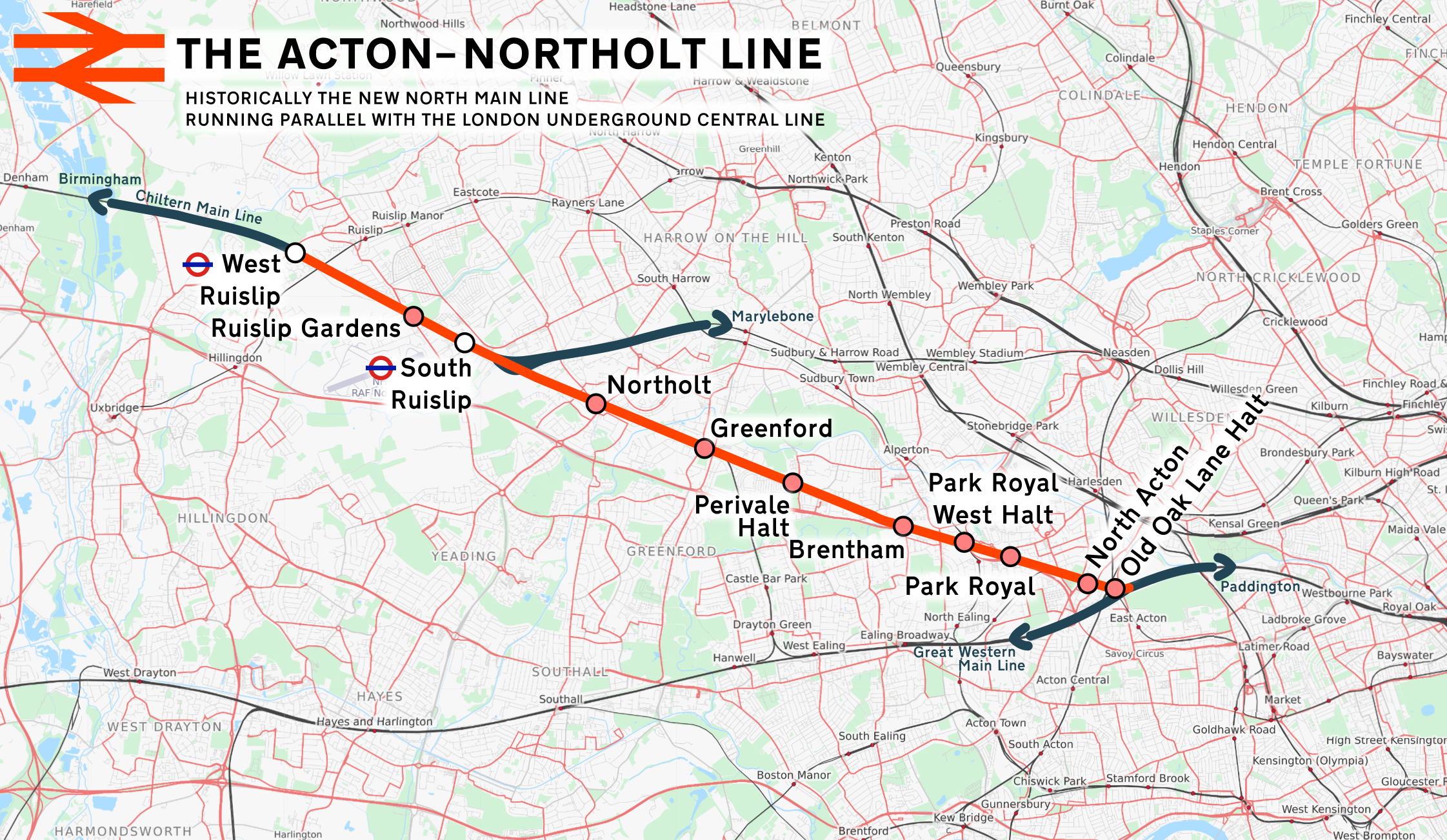
(Click to expand)

The Acton–Northolt line (ANL), otherwise known as the New North Main Line (NNML), is a railway line in Greater London, England. Built between 1903 and 1906, it runs from the Great Western Main Line at Old Oak Common TMD to the Chiltern Main Line at South Ruislip, alongside the West Ruislip branch of the London Underground Central line, for a distance of around 11 miles (18 km).

== History ==
Historically known as the New North Main Line, it opened in 1903 as part of a joint project by the Great Central Railway (GCR) and the Great Western Railway (GWR) to improve access to their termini from London to the Midlands and North of England, especially relative to the London and North Western Railway (LNWR). It begins at Old Oak Junction on the Great Western Main Line (GWML) from Paddington and runs via Greenford to join what is now the Chiltern Main Line at Northolt Junction, southeast of South Ruislip.

The line joined the Great Western and Great Central Joint Railway between West Ruislip and Denham station in 1906. Its original name was "Denham – Junction for Uxbridge" as it was planned to be a stop on the shuttle service between Gerrards Cross and Uxbridge High Street. The latter was closed in 1964 and later demolished.

Since 1948 the West Ruislip branch of the London Underground Central line has run alongside it.

In the past, it carried many trains to the northwest, and it was heavily used in the 1960s when electrification work restricted capacity on the West Coast Main Line (WCML); but when that project was completed in May 1974, express services from London to Birmingham on the GWR/GCR route were discontinued as part of the Beeching cuts. All local trains on the route were diverted to Marylebone via Sudbury in 1963, and Greenford station on the New North Main Line was closed.

In the early 1990s the New North route was reduced to a single-track layout between Old Oak Common and Park Royal and between Greenford and South Ruislip. No improvement work has been carried out on the line since then.

Plans at this date to close Greenford East signal box and its semaphore signals, with upgraded signalling controlled by Slough and Marylebone signalling centres, were postponed indefinitely as decline of rail traffic controlled by Greenford East did not justify the cost.

In 2018 the section between Park Royal Sidings and Old Oak Common was closed for construction of HS2 and the connection with the GWML at Old Oak Common was severed.

== Modern use ==
As described, the Central line has largely replaced its business.

Until December 2018 it was used for goods trains carrying refuse from London and was a diversionary route when the normal lines to Marylebone or Paddington were closed. Chiltern Railways operated a token service to and from Paddington on weekdays; the 10:57 from South Ruislip and 11:35 return which continued forward from South Ruislip, terminating at High Wycombe. It was replaced by service to West Ealing via the Greenford line. The line from Greenford to Park Royal is still used for goods trains carrying refuse from London.

For operational reasons such as balancing wheel wear, trains including those of Heathrow Express which were affected by tight track at Heathrow Junction have been turned using the London end of the NNML, its triangular junction with the Greenford Branch Line and the GWML through Ealing. At weekends between 2008 and 2011 when major engineering works were taking place on the West Coast Main Line, it was also used by Virgin Trains' London Euston to Birmingham International Blockade Buster service, which ran via Willesden, Acton Main Line, Ealing Broadway, Greenford, High Wycombe, Banbury and Coventry using Super Voyager sets up to 15 carriages long. At other times it was used by Chiltern Main Line services when the route to Marylebone was blocked; or by GWML services (via Banbury and Didcot) if the line through Reading is blocked.

The route is also used for testing out new trains and for the training of new drivers.

The line is now officially known as the Acton to Northolt Line, and carries the Engineer's Line Reference code of ANL.

=== Ruislip Waste Transfer ===
A siding was built in 1980 to serve the then-new waste transfer station at Victoria Road, South Ruislip.

== Future developments ==
Old Oak Common station is proposed for the combined part of the route with the GWML, for connections to and from the Elizabeth line. Additional tunnelling under the New North Main Line will keep the line free for other potential passenger services, as in the April 2013 published decision by High Speed 2 and the Department for Transport to recommend further bore tunnelling under the 5.6 miles (9.0 km) of the 'Northolt Corridor' within the London Borough of Ealing.

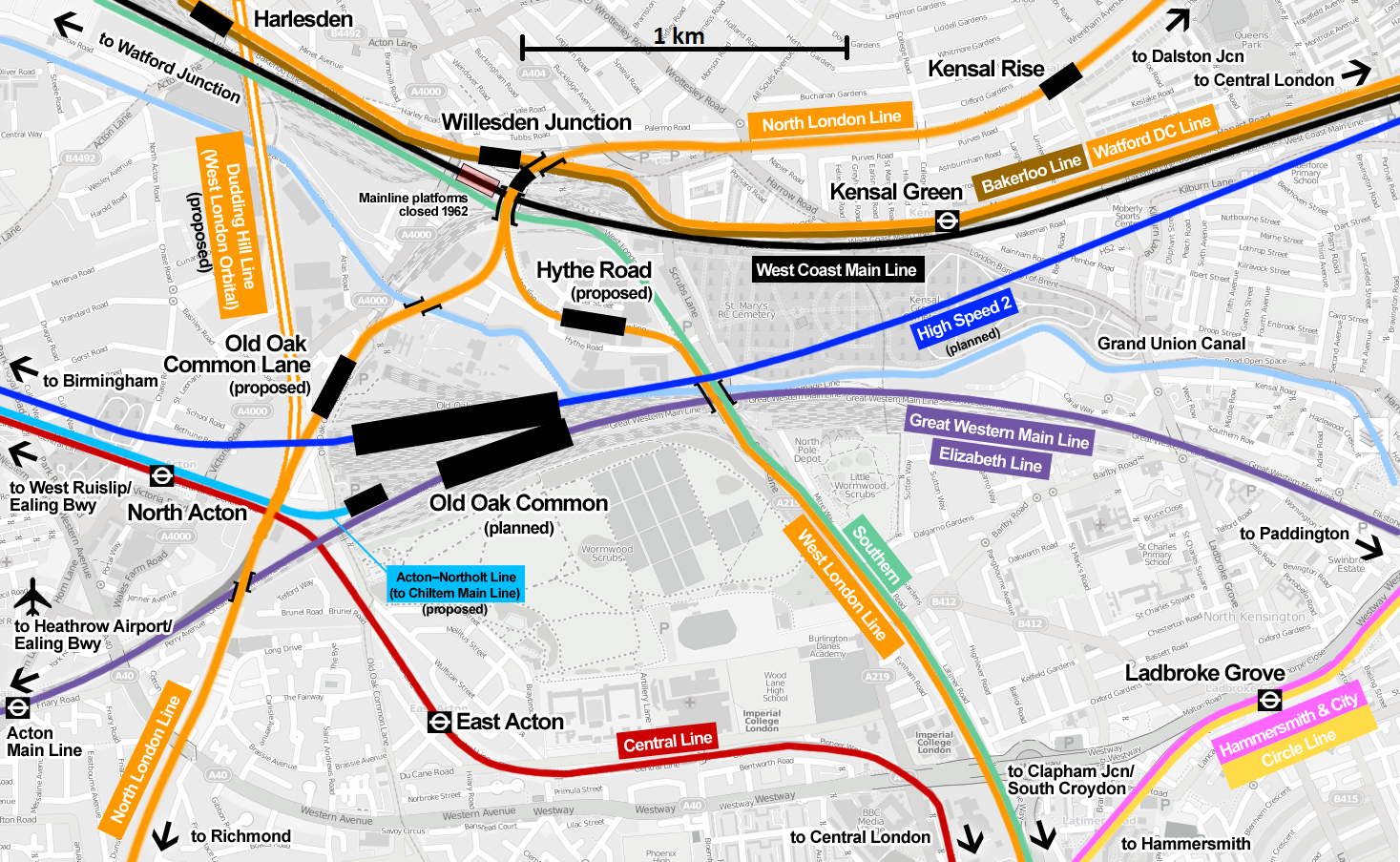
Acton North tube station in relation to the Old Oak Common proposals.

The tunnel will minimise traffic and noise blight which a surface route would otherwise have caused. The further bore tunnelling will link up the tunnels already planned beneath South Ruislip and Ruislip Gardens and Old Oak Common to North Acton. HS2 Ltd found in a study it had undertaken that bore tunnelling this stretch of the HS2 route would take 15 months less than constructing a surface HS2 route through this area and be at least cost-neutral. Cost neutrality flows from avoiding 20 bridge replacements, particularly 3 1/2 years to replace road over rail bridges at the Hanger Lane Gyratory System, amenity disruption, the construction of intermediate tunnel portals and the likelihood of substantial compensation payments. The tunnelling will mean the New North Main Line is severed twice and has been lifted at its entrance to Old Oak Common. It has not been decided whether the line will be restored once construction is complete. However, as of mid-2024, the line is still in situ as a complete route from north of Old Oak Common to South Ruislip, however it is not used as such.

There is a proposal that it could see a new Chiltern Railways, HS2 or Elizabeth Line station built next to the LUL station or an expansion of the North Acton tube station, which has already been upgraded and saw work on step free access as of 2018, but it was not fully implemented by 2023 and is ongoing, as is other upgrading work.

A think tank with lobby group support has suggested that the line be used as part of services linking High Speed 1 to Heathrow Airport.

The London Mayor has responded to a proposal that the line becomes an additional branch of Crossrail.

In a summary report by Network Rail which was released in 2017 proposed that by 2043 that there should be a new terminal at Old Oak Common. This would mean an upgrade of the line to allow regular trains to once again run to the GWML replacing the current parliamentary service which runs from High Wycombe to West Ealing. Up to 4 trains per hour could run to Old Oak Common by 2043. The proposed upgrade would see redoubling of the line to a two-track railway with the possibility of line-speed improvements into the one or more platforms that could be provided at 'Old Oak Common' for the Chiltern Main Line. The number of platforms would depend on the number of services.

== The line's former stations and sidings ==
=== Ruislip Gardens tube station ===
The tracks through the station were laid by the Great Western and Great Central Joint Railway with services starting on 2 April 1906, although there was no station at Ruislip Gardens at that time. The station opened on 9 July 1934.

As part of the 1935–40 New Works Programme, Central line services were projected westwards from a new junction, west of North Acton on the line to Ealing Broadway. The original intention was to extend the service as far as Denham, but work was delayed by World War II and the terminus of the extension was cut back to West Ruislip, with services starting on 21 November 1948.

Mainline services calling at Ruislip Gardens ceased in 1958 and the mainline station closed, the Central line station remaining open. Until recently the entrance to a passenger stairwell was visible on the London-bound side of the Network Rail tracks.

=== Northolt facilities ===
==== Northolt goods yard and carriage sidings ====
These served several local businesses and were also used to store spare British Rail and London Underground stock on occasion. They were abandoned in the early 1990s.

==== Northolt Halt and station ====
Northolt Halt, located on the opposite side of the road bridge from the current Northolt tube station, was opened by the GWR in 1907. It was later renamed "Northolt (for West End) Halt", before gaining station status under its original shorter name. It was closed in 1948 following the extension of the Central line to West Ruislip, the current tube station opening on 21 November 1948.

=== Greenford facilities ===
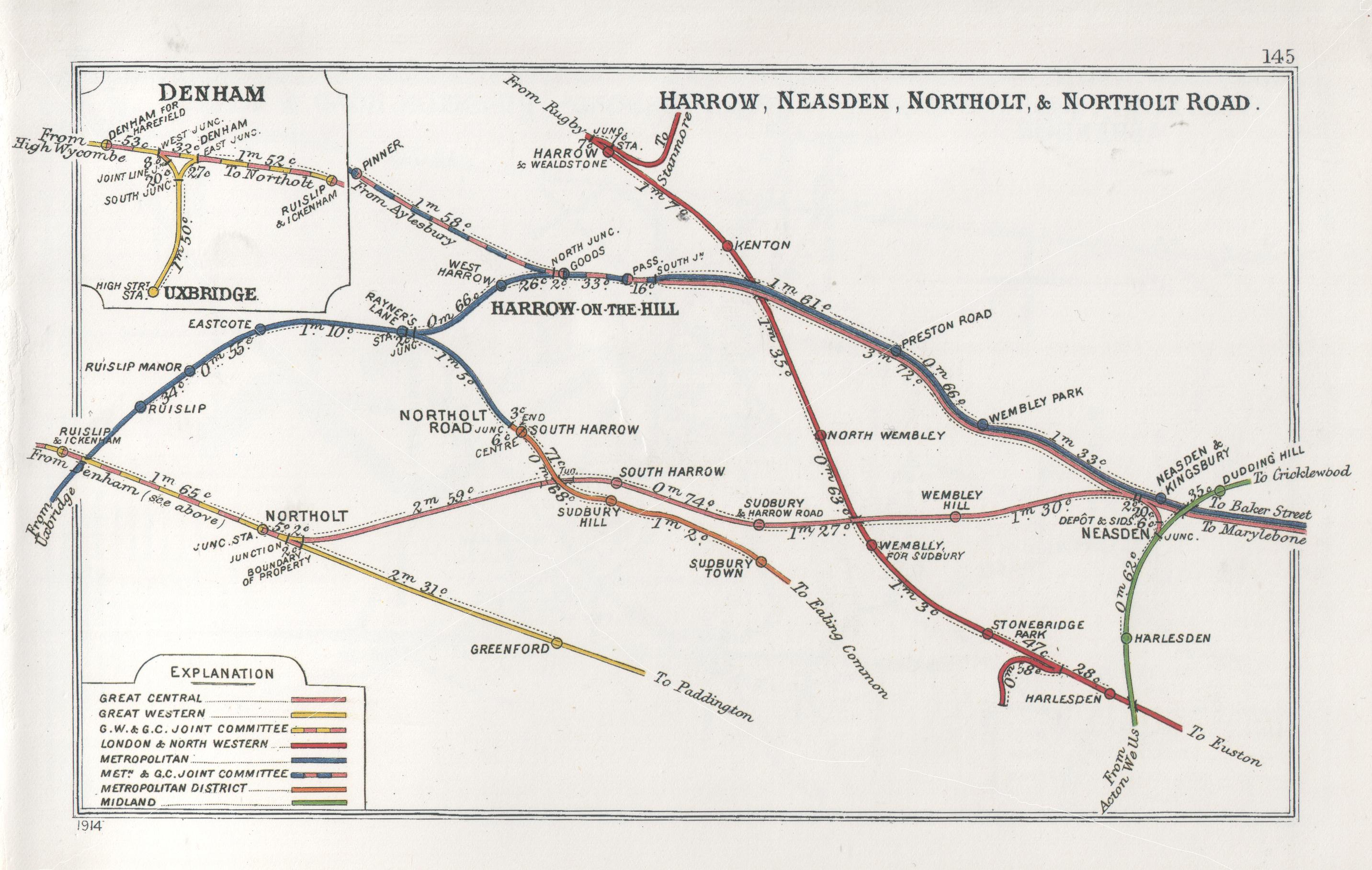
A 1914 Railway Clearing House map of railways in the vicinity of Greenford.

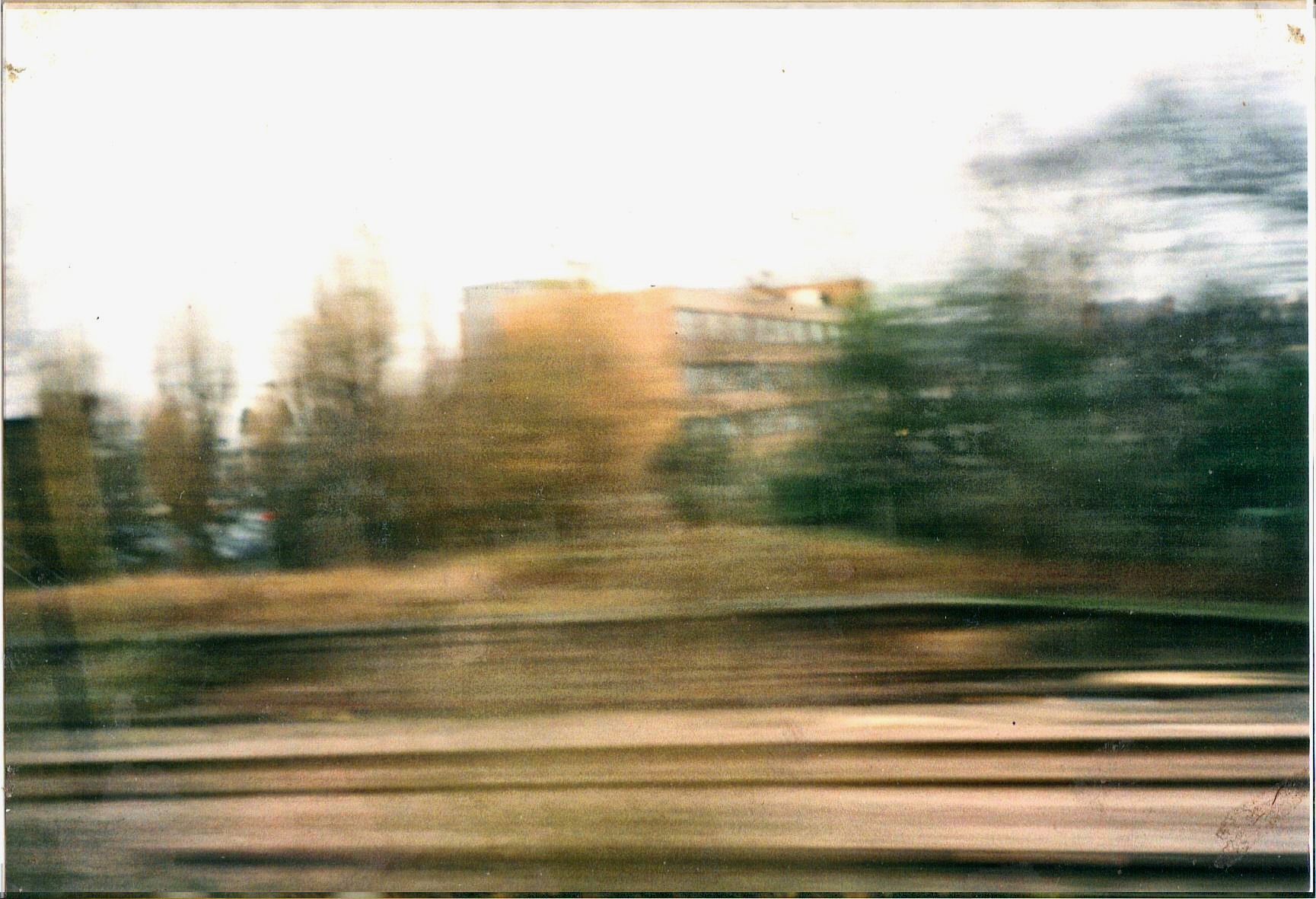
The GWR Greenford station in 2001. The forecourt of the surviving platform and part of the platform itself are now built upon by a 1990s business park.

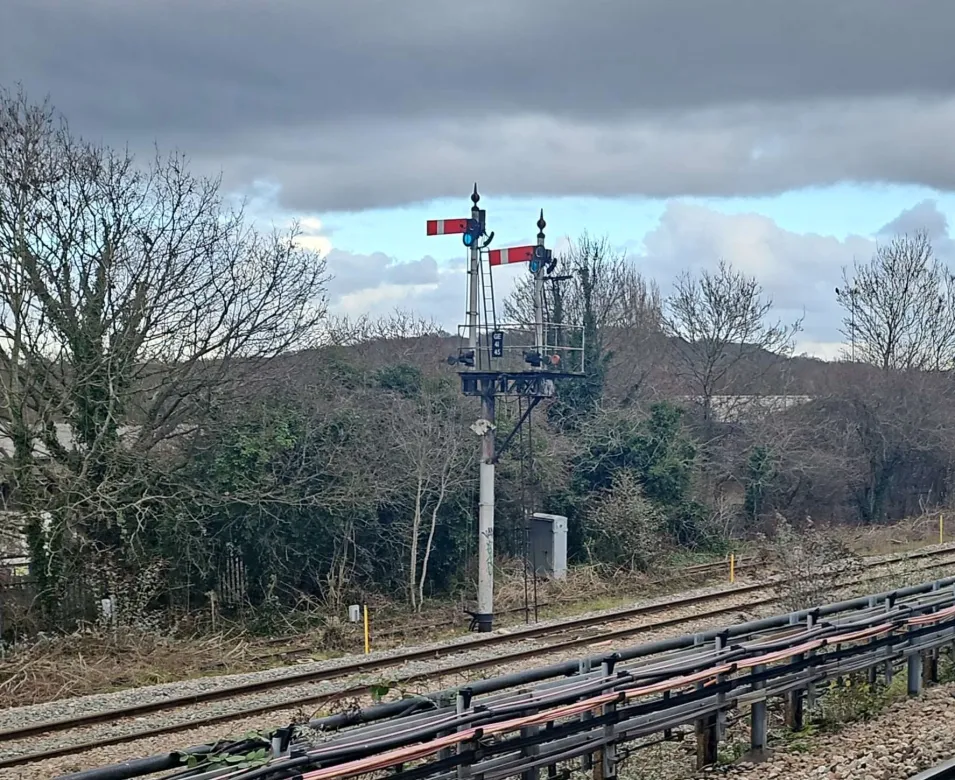
Semaphore signals still in place at Greenford station in 2026.

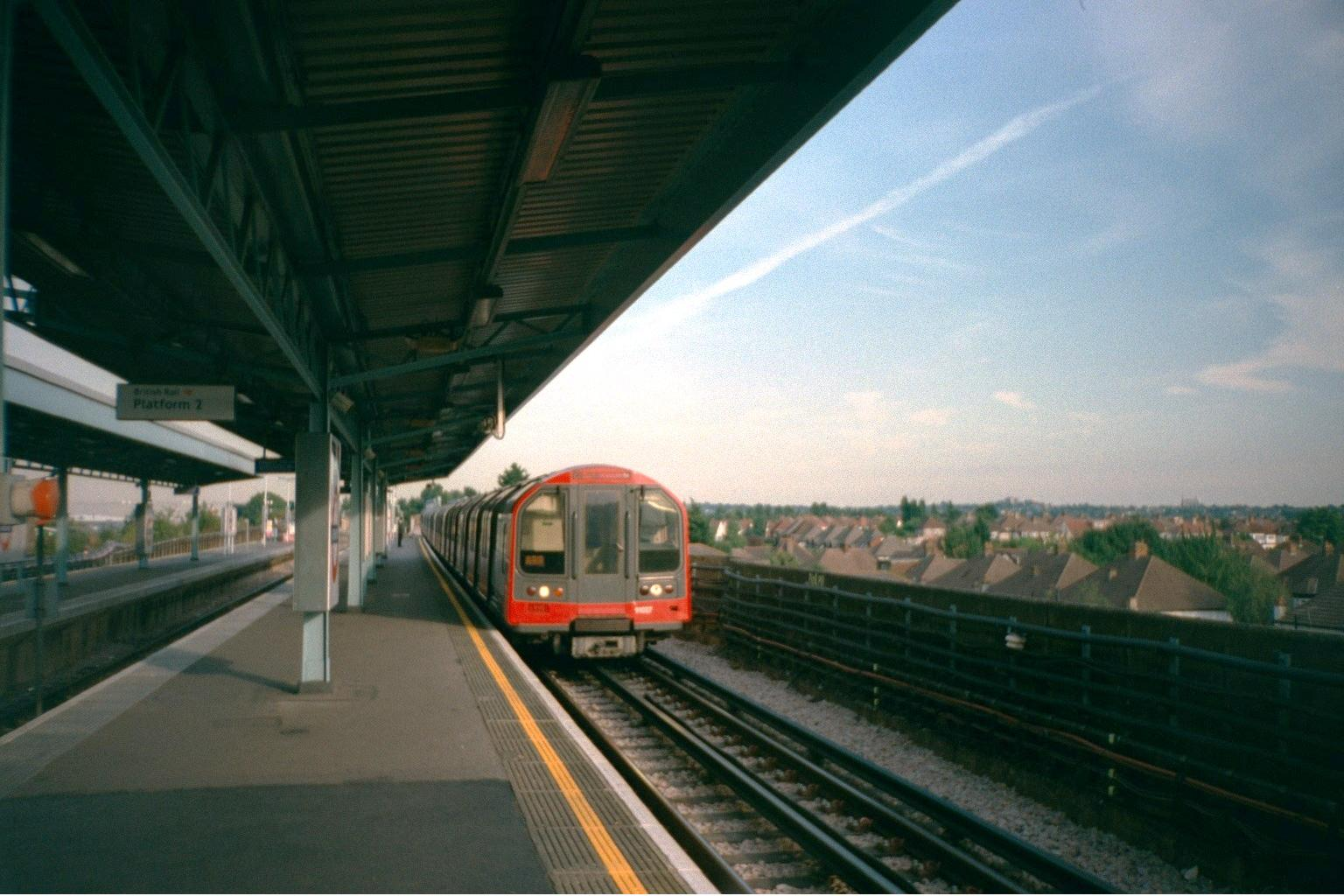
A London Underground train entering Greenford station in 2006.

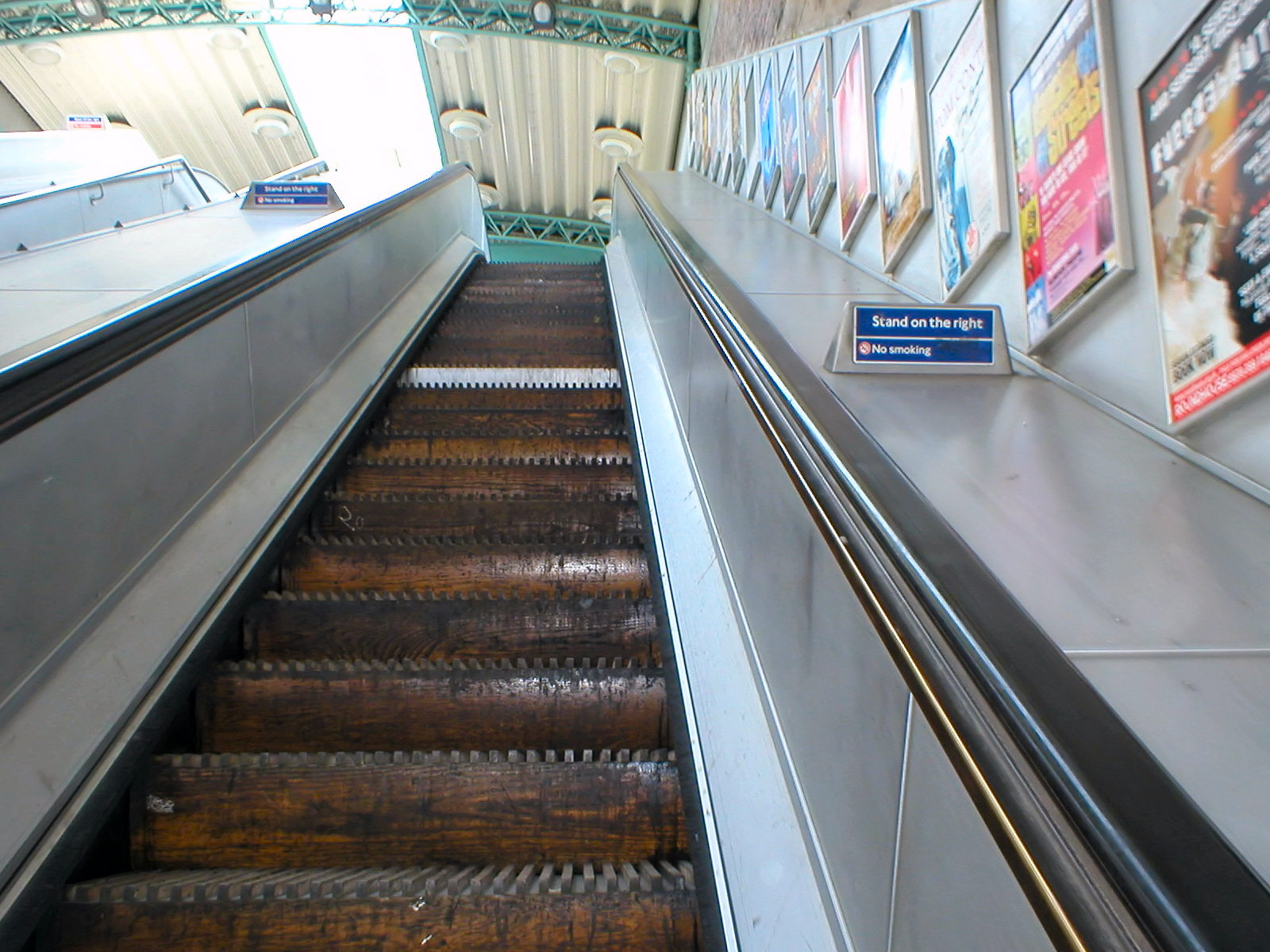
The remaining wooden escalators at Greenford in June 2006, removed in 2014 and replaced with an inclinator. The wooden escalator leading up to the platforms, was the last of its kind in use on the London Underground.

==== British Bath Company siding ====
This siding served the British Bath Company factory beside the Paddington Branch of the Grand Union Canal. It was lifted when the factory closed in the late 1970s, and the area is now occupied by Fairway Industrial Estate.

==== Kelvin Construction siding ====
This siding served the Kelvin Construction factory, next to that of the British Bath Company. The area is now occupied by Kelvin Industrial Estate.

==== Aladdin Industries siding ====
This siding served the Aladdin lamp factory, a short distance south of the British Bath Company and Kelvin factories. It was lifted when the factory closed in the early 1980s (although the main factory building is still extant), and the area is now occupied by a business park.

A Rugby Cement Terminal was immediately to the west of the former Greenford station up platform. This closed in about 1990.

==== Greenford station ====
The original Greenford station was opened by the Great Western Railway on 1 October 1904.

The present station, adjacent to the original, was built as part of the Central line extension of the 1935–40 New Works Programme of the London Passenger Transport Board. It opened on 30 June 1947 after delay due to World War II. Service at the original station was gradually reduced and it was closed in 1963.

==== Greenford freight sidings ====
These served several local businesses, but were closed in the 1990s.

=== Perivale facilities ===
==== Perivale GPO sidings ====
These originally served the local Royal Mail distribution centre and sorting office, but were disused for this purpose for decades until eventual closure in the early 2000s.

==== Perivale Halt railway station ====
The Great Western Railway opened "Perivale Halt" on 2 May 1904. It closed on 15 June 1947, after the extension of the Central line to Ruislip. It had long wooden platforms and pagoda shelters, on an embankment reached by sloping paths west of Horsenden Lane South. The steam "push-and-pull" passenger service ran to Paddington; the line (the last main line to be built before High Speed 1) was shared with freight and with express trains to Birmingham (2 hours non-stop). Until the late 1920s, Perivale was entirely rural, despite its proximity to Ealing.

A Lens of Sutton photograph of the station is on page 77 of The forgotten Stations of Greater London by J.E. Connor and B.L. Halford (Connor and Butler) (ISBN 0947699 17 1). There was a similar halt at South Greenford before it was modernised by Network SouthEast.

The current London Underground station was opened on 30 June 1947.

==== Sanderson & Sons sidings ====
These sidings served the Perivale factory of wallpaper firm Arthur Sanderson & Sons. They were lifted following the closure of the factory in the early 1970s.

=== Hanger Lane facilities ===
==== Twyford Abbey Halt and Brentham station ====
Twyford Abbey Halt, located just to the east of the current Hanger Lane tube station, was opened by the GWR on 1 May 1904. It was closed on 1 May 1911 and replaced by Brentham station, located to the west. This station, later renamed "Brentham (for North Ealing)", was closed between 1915 and 1920 due to World War I economies, and closed altogether in 1947 when the Central line was extended to West Ruislip. The current tube station, which opened on 30 June 1947, was called Hanger Lane as it was near that road.

==== Hanger Lane sidings ====
These few sidings were used by both London Underground and local businesses. They have now been mostly removed and the remaining one was heavily overgrown as of 2008.

=== Park Royal facilities ===
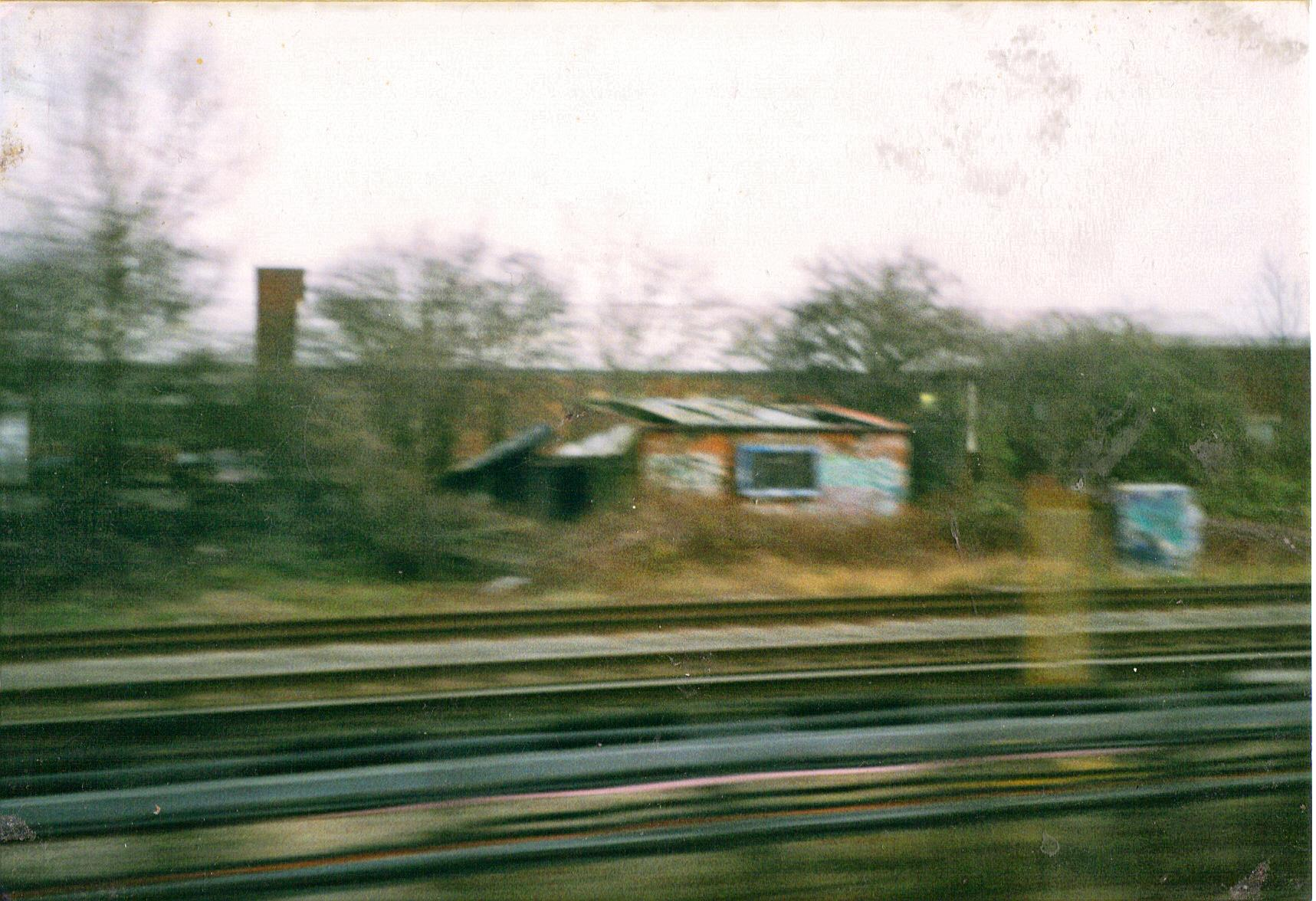
A derelict permanent way hut south of the location of Park Royal West Halt, in 2002.

==== Brentham for North Ealing and Greystoke Park ====
Brentham for North Ealing and Greystoke Park was a railway station in the Park Royal district of London, on the New North Main Line. It opened as on 1 May 1911 as a replacement for Twyford Abbey Halt, but closed on 15 June 1947 in advance of the opening of the extension of the Central Line from North Acton to Greenford on 30 June 1947 and its subsequent replacement by Hanger Lane.

==== Park Royal West Halt ====
This halt was open between 1932 and 1947. It was located just to the east of the bridge carrying the London Underground Piccadilly line.

==== Park Royal Guinness brewery and sidings ====
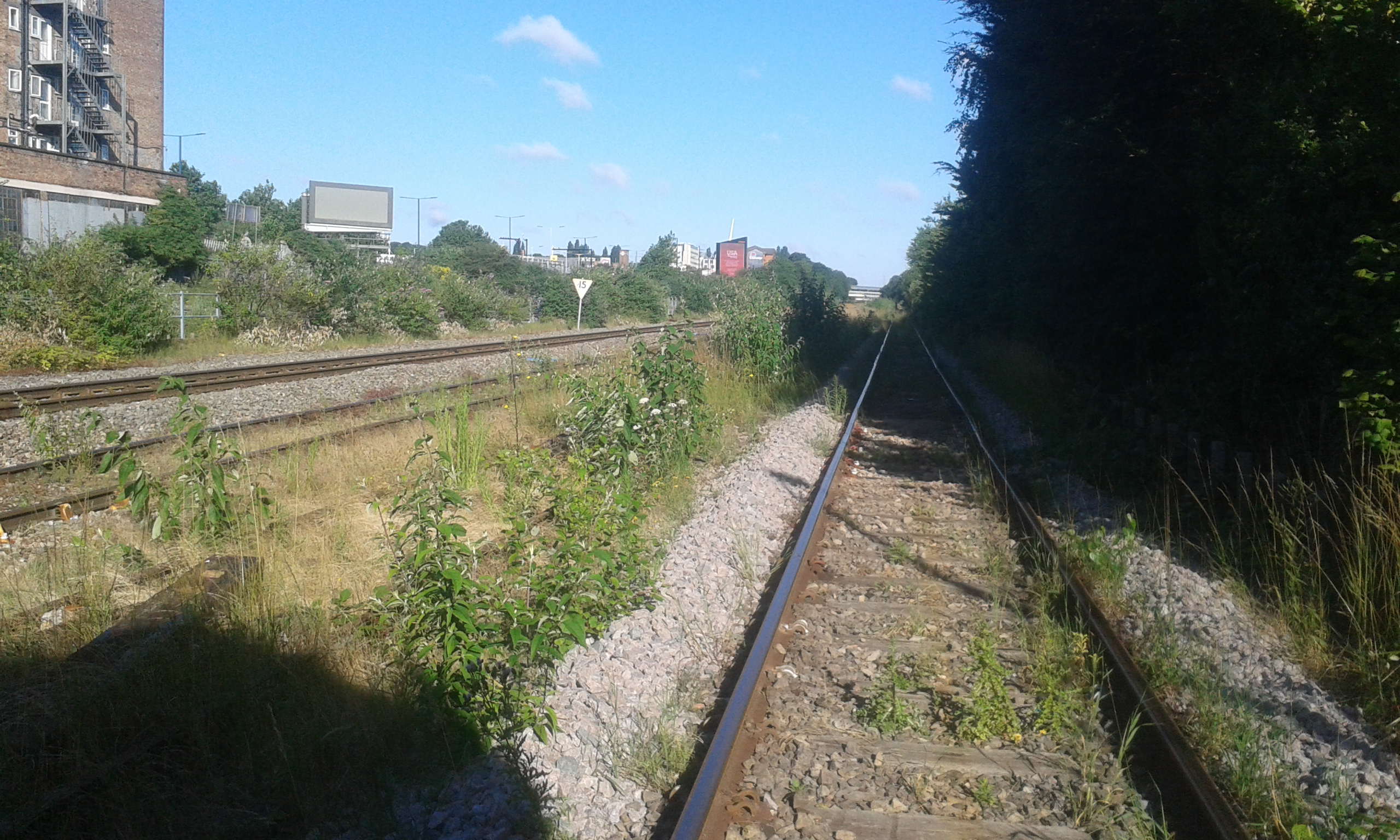
Sidings at the former Guinness Brewery in July 2016, looking west

These served the now demolished local Guinness plant, but were closed by the early 1990s. The sidings are currently used for aggregate trains supplying a Lafarge Tarmac depot.

Three possible transport services have been proposed for the area; the West London Orbital, Fastbus and the North and West London Light railway.

In 2004, the multinational company Diageo agreed to build extra Central line platforms at Park Royal tube station, as part of its First Central business park, built on the site of the former Guinness brewery. As of 2010, this had not yet happened.

==== Park Royal station ====
Park Royal station opened with the line in 1903, and closed in 1937. It should not be confused with the current station of the same name on the Piccadilly line, which opened in 1931.

==== British Can Company sidings ====
These sidings served the Acton factory of the British Can Company (later taken over by Metal Box & Printing Industries), as well as the adjacent Walters' Palm Toffee factory. They were lifted in the mid-1960s, although the bridge that carried them over the Central line is still extant.

==== The Fiat (England) siding ====
Long since closed.

==== Joseph's siding ====
Long since closed.

==== The Marcon Topmix stone terminal sidings ====
They both served the Marcon Topmix stone works, but were mothballed in the late 2000s (decade).

=== North Acton tube station ===
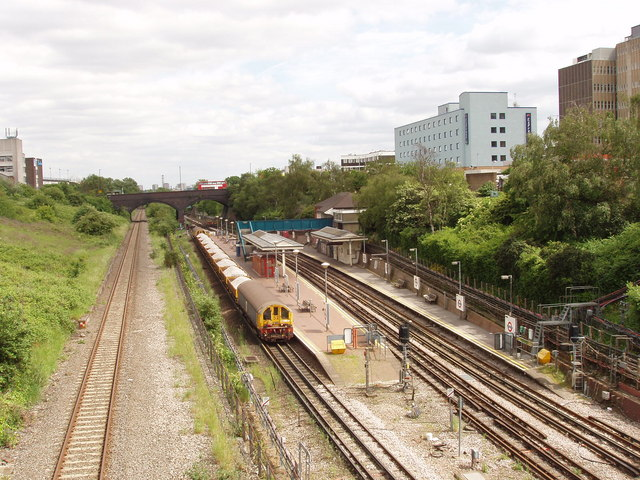
The NNML line (far left) at North Acton in May 2006. It has now been reduced to freight and diversionary services. Photo from the Chase Road bridge, with the Victoria Road bridge at the top of the photo.

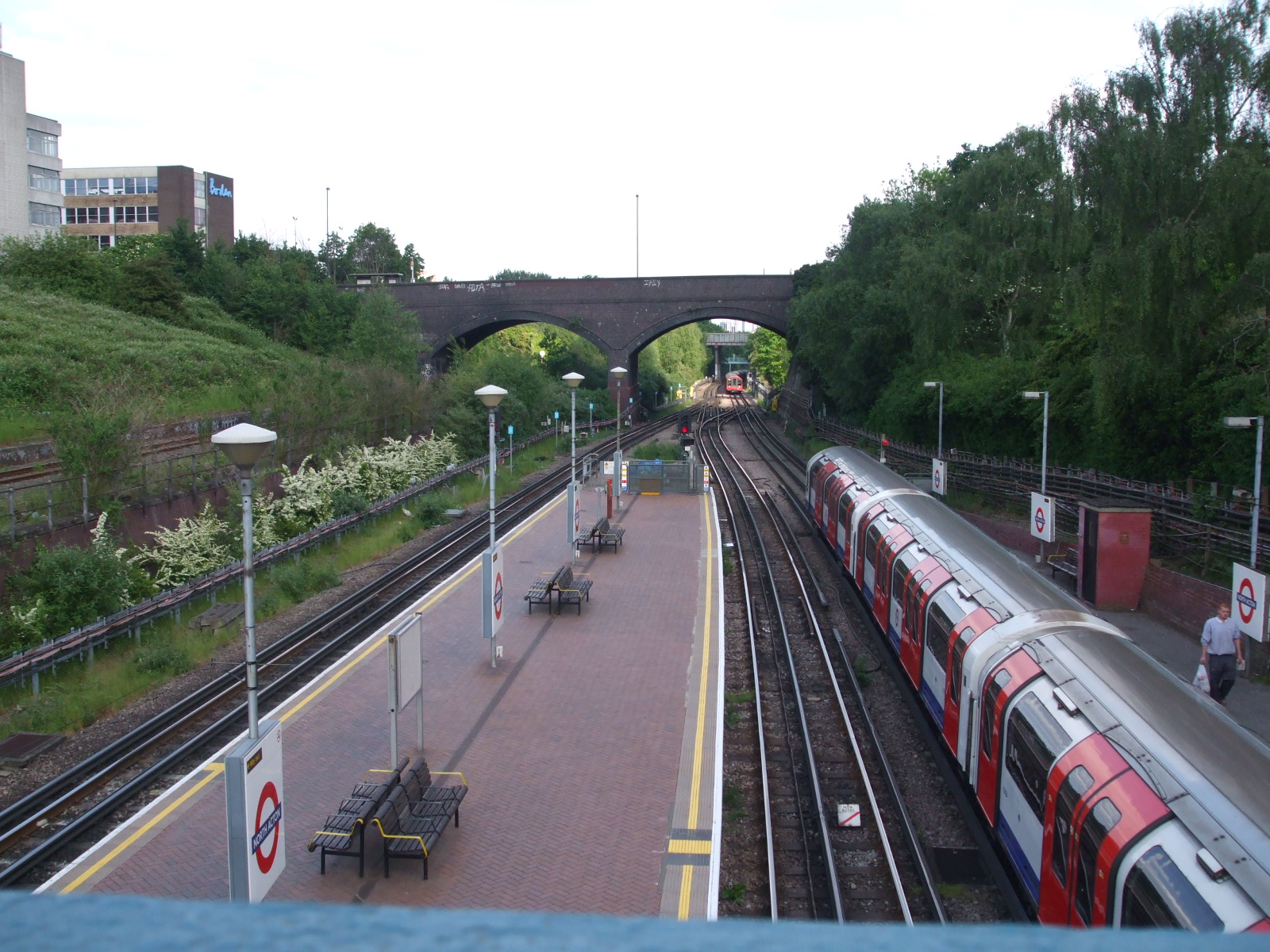
North Acton station in May 2008, looking east. Tracks from the left have been two of the NNML, two GWR freight and the two original Central line track beds. The bridge in the middle distance carries the North London Line.

The joint New North Main Line (NNML) of the Great Central and Great Western opened in 1903 and its North Acton Halt followed in 1904 however this only remained open until 1913. A new station opened in 1923 concurrent with the Central London Railway station but closed on 30 June 1947 when local services on the line were withdrawn.

The Central London Railway (the precursor of the Central line) opened its adjoining North Acton station in 1923 on its 1920 extension to Ealing Broadway. As Transport for London explains:

On 18 August 1911, the Central London Railway abandoned its policy of no through running with any other railway, and secured powers to build a short extension from Wood Lane to connect with the intended Ealing & Shepherds Bush line of the Great Western Railway, over which it proposed to exercise running powers.

North of the Central line tracks were two freight lines, removed in the 1960s, running alongside the Central line as far as White City. To the north of those at a slightly higher level were the two tracks of the NNML. The footbridge to the NNML platforms is on the extreme left of this 1933 photograph.

The NNML platforms closed when the Central line was extended on new track from North Acton to Greenford station in 1947. Between South Ruislip station and Old Oak Junction, the GWR line was progressively run down, and in many places reduced to single-track, including the stretch running past the tube station. From May 2008 only freight trains and a token once-daily passenger service provided by Chiltern Railways used this stretch of line until closure in December 2018.

=== Old Oak Lane Halt railway station ===
Old Oak Lane Halt railway station was opened by the Great Western Railway in 1906 within the complex of lines at the south east end of the New North Main Line, a location with low potential for passenger traffic. It closed in 1947 without a replacement when the Central line of London Underground was extended from North Acton to West Ruislip alongside the NNML under the 1935–1940 New Works Programme delayed by World War II.

== See also ==
- High Speed 2
- North and West London Light Railway (proposal)
- List of closed railway stations in London
