= College Park, London =

Area in London, England

Coordinates: 51.527°N 0.233°W

College Park
- Location within Greater London
- Population: 9,175 (2011 Census. College Park and Old Oak Ward)
- Ceremonial county: Greater London
- Region: London
- Country: England
- Sovereign state: United Kingdom
- Post town: LONDON
- Postcode district: NW10
- Dialling code: 020
- Police: Metropolitan
- Fire: London
- Ambulance: London
- UK Parliament: Ealing Central and Acton

College Park is a small mainly residential neighbourhood in Kensal Green, to the north of the borough of Hammersmith and Fulham, London and is near Kensal Green station and Willesden Junction station. It borders the London Borough of Brent to the north and the Royal Borough of Kensington and Chelsea to the east. It is part of College Park & Old Oak wards of the United Kingdom.

The housing stock in College Park is largely bay-fronted Victorian terraced houses built in the late 1800s. Kenmont Primary School is at its centre and within the neighbourhood is The Mayhew Animal Home.

Kenmont Primary School (formerly Kenmont Gardens School) built in 1883

== History ==
Early History

The land on which College Park stands originally belonged to All Souls' College, Oxford. This explains the etymology of many local place names (e.g. All Souls' Avenue, College Road, All Souls Cemetery). All Souls' College owned the vast majority of land in "old Kensal Green", extending northwards in two prongs towards Willesden Green and Harlesden Green and in many respects it was an extra-parochial area.

Arrival of the Grand Junction Canal

Small-scale development of Kensal started with the opening of the Paddington Arm of the Grand Junction Canal (later Grand Union Canal) in 1801. Goods barges carrying coal and iron were towed through the village and a brick works opened. Further housing development was linked to the building of the first of London's grand cemeteries, All Souls' Cemetery (also known as Kensal Green Cemetery) built by the General Cemetery Company in Kensal Green to provide a large burial ground for London in 1832. The construction of the 1838 London & North Western line (Euston to Birmingham) and the 1838–41 Great Western Railway (Paddington to Bristol) followed shortly after.

To the west of All Souls' Cemetery wall, there were just three houses: 1) Tavistock Villa, where the Rev. J. N. Heard, Cemetery Chaplain and Curate of St. John's Church, Kensal Green lived; 2) Kensal Lodge; and 3) Kensal Manor House. These were the only properties in the area of College Park at the time.

A famous author

In 1835, the famous 19th Century historical gothic romance novelist William Harrison Ainsworth took up residence in Kensal Lodge with his 'connections', Mrs Touchet and her sister Miss Buckley, where he lived until 1841. The author had been recently propelled from obscurity to fame with his novel Rookwood which popularised the myth of Dick Turpin and his mare Black Bess. It was within Kensal Lodge that he wrote the novel Jack Sheppard amongst other works. In 1841, he subsequently moved to the adjacent Kensal Manor House. For fourteen years, these two buildings successively became hubs of London literary life thanks to Ainsworth being a lavish entertainer. Many famous Victorian literary figures came to dine at the two buildings, including Thackeray, George Cruikshank (the artist and illustrator of Dicken's work as well as some of Ainsworth), Benjamin Disraeli, and Charles Dickens.

Divided by faith

In 1858, St. Mary's Roman Catholic Cemetery was established to the south of College Park and adjacent to All Souls' Cemetery. Notable burials include Sir Antony Panizzi (d. 1879), the Italian-born principal librarian of British Museum, who was partly responsible for the creation of the famous Round Reading Room, and Prince Louis Bonaparte (d. 1891), a nephew of Napoleon I. During the first 8 years of its existence some 12,500 burials took place, many of the Irish immigrants of the Great Famine years finding their last resting place here.

A suburban rail station

In 1860 the Hampstead Junction Railway opened. A station directly north of College Park, called Kensal Green & Harlesden, followed in 1861. Willesden Junction station on the London & North Western Railway was built in 1866. A map from 1870 to 1871 shows Kensal Manor House, Kensal Lodge and Tavistock Villa facing Harrow Road on the eastern side of College Park. Alongside these properties stand St. Marys Terrace and Alma Place. The remainder of College Park was entirely undeveloped. In 1873, Kensal Green & Harlesden station moved to the location of the current Kensal Rise station.

An education

Kenmont Primary School (formerly Kenmont Gardens School) was built in 1883. It was designed for the London School Board by Edward Robert Robson. It ranges between three and six storeys and dwarfs the surrounding houses in College Park. When the school opened on 4 February 1884, there was accommodation for some 795 pupils, including boys, girls and infants. College Park also had a library at Letchford Gardens, close to the school.

A Victorian Estate

By 1894, College Park was well developed with houses constructed on Waldo Road, Letchford Gardens, Rigeley Road, Valliere Road, and Kenmont Gardens. Ponsard Road was only developed on the north side. There were no houses on Holberton Gardens and the east side of Trenmar Gardens was the site of a Tramway Depot for trams on the Harrow Road. A public house – College Park Hotel – was also present on the junction of Harrow Road and Scrubs Lane. The area north of the Hampstead Junction Railway was still undeveloped at this stage.

College Park is depicted in Charles Booth's survey into life and labour in London. The 1898–99 map classifies the area as middle class, fairly comfortable and mixed (some comfortable and others poor). In this map, College Park is shown as part of the parish of St. John, Kensal Green (detached) in the Paddington deanery. Geographically, it is detached from the remainder of the parish of St. John, Kensal Green by the parish of St. Martin, Kensal Rise.

College Park Hotel, Harrow Road in 1906

A sporting religion

The spiritual needs of College Park residents were served by a Presbyterian Chapel (seats for 600) and a Baptist Chapel (seats for 150) on Kenmont Gardens. There was also Christ Church mission to College Park on the south side of Ponsard Road on the current site of the Mayhew Animal Home. Christ Church Rangers, a local boys' football team formed in 1882, were based at the Christ Church Mission. An amalgamation with another local boys' team, St Judes Institute in the Queens Park Estate, led to the formation of Queens Park Rangers F.C. in 1886.

Mason's Arms, Harrow Road

Watering holes

There were several public houses in the immediate vicinity of College Park at the turn of the century. These included Waldo Arms, Waldo Road; College Park Hotel, Harrow Road; and the Mason's Arms, Harrow Road. Only the Mason's Arms remains a public house, with Waldo Arms and College Park Hotel turned into a house and flats respectively. There were applications for further public houses and hotels which were refused repeatedly, including an application for the Albert Victor Hotel on the junction of Trenmar Gardens and Harrow Road.

Baker Street & Waterloo Railway

By the first World War, the area to the north of College Park had undergone substantial housing development. However relatively little had changed in College Park. Prior to the first World War, Holberton Gardens was constructed and number 1 – 11 Waldo Road were removed. On 10 May 1915, the Bakerloo line extension between Queens Park and Willesden Junction opened. The Bakerloo line thus became the first London Tube line to be physically connected with one of the main line railways. Bakerloo line services opened at Willesden Junction station in May, 1915 and Kensal Green station in October, 1916.

The Mayhew Animal Home, College Park

Local Economic Activity

In the past, College Park housed a number of metal works and engineering industries. For example, Waldo Works on both sides of Waldo Road manufactured motor bodies and there were several other industrial units on Trenmar Gardens producing sheet metal and fabricating motor bodies. There was also an orphanage (Trenmar House) and the Mayhew Animal Home (formerly part of the R.S.P.C.A). This was established in 1886 and can be found on the corner of Ponsard Road and Trenmar Gardens. With the exception of the Mayhew Animal Home, these commercial sites have now been replaced with new housing or converted into live/work units.

Cumberland Park, south of College Park on Scrubs Lane, was the site of further employment including Cumberland Park Factory (producing bedding) and Simplex works (producing rubber), a laundry, and a neon sign works. This was also the site for Western Bottling Dairy where milk was distributed by rail around London.

== Future ==
Under the Government's High Speed 2 proposals, Old Oak Common railway station (which borders College Park to the south west) will be the site of a Crossrail interchange, capitalising on Old Oak Common's existing rail network.

== Politics ==
College Park is part of the College Park and Old Oak ward for elections to Hammersmith and Fulham London Borough Council.
