= Geoffrey Warren =

British businessman

- Occupation: Businessman
- Known for: Founder of Cargiant

Geoffrey Warren (born February 1955) is the owner of Cargiant, the world's largest independent car dealership.

== Career ==
In 1976, Warren founded Cargiant. In 2007, Cargiant became the world's largest independent car dealership. As of 2018, Cargiant stocked around 8,000 cars on a 45-acre site.

In December 2019, the Old Oak and Park Royal Development Corporation (OPDC) had planned to buy 54 acres at Old Oak Common owned by Cargiant by compulsory purchase order, but Cargiant successfully disputed the value of the land, and the sale fell through.

As of 2021, Warren owns 6.33 million sq ft of land in London. Based on a 2017 list compiled by propertyweek.com, Warren is estimated to be London's 10th largest land owner.

Warren has a net worth of £2.552 billion, according to The Sunday Times Rich List 2022.

Geoffrey Warren ranked as the 74th highest taxpayer in the UK, contributing £14.7 million in a single year, as reported in 'The Tax List 2024: the U.K.’s 100 Biggest Taxpayers', published by The Times on January 26, 2024.

== Personal life ==
In 2016, Warren was linked to the purchase of the UK's most expensive property in One Hyde Park.
