= Old Oak Common railway station =

Railway station under construction in London, England

Old Oak Common
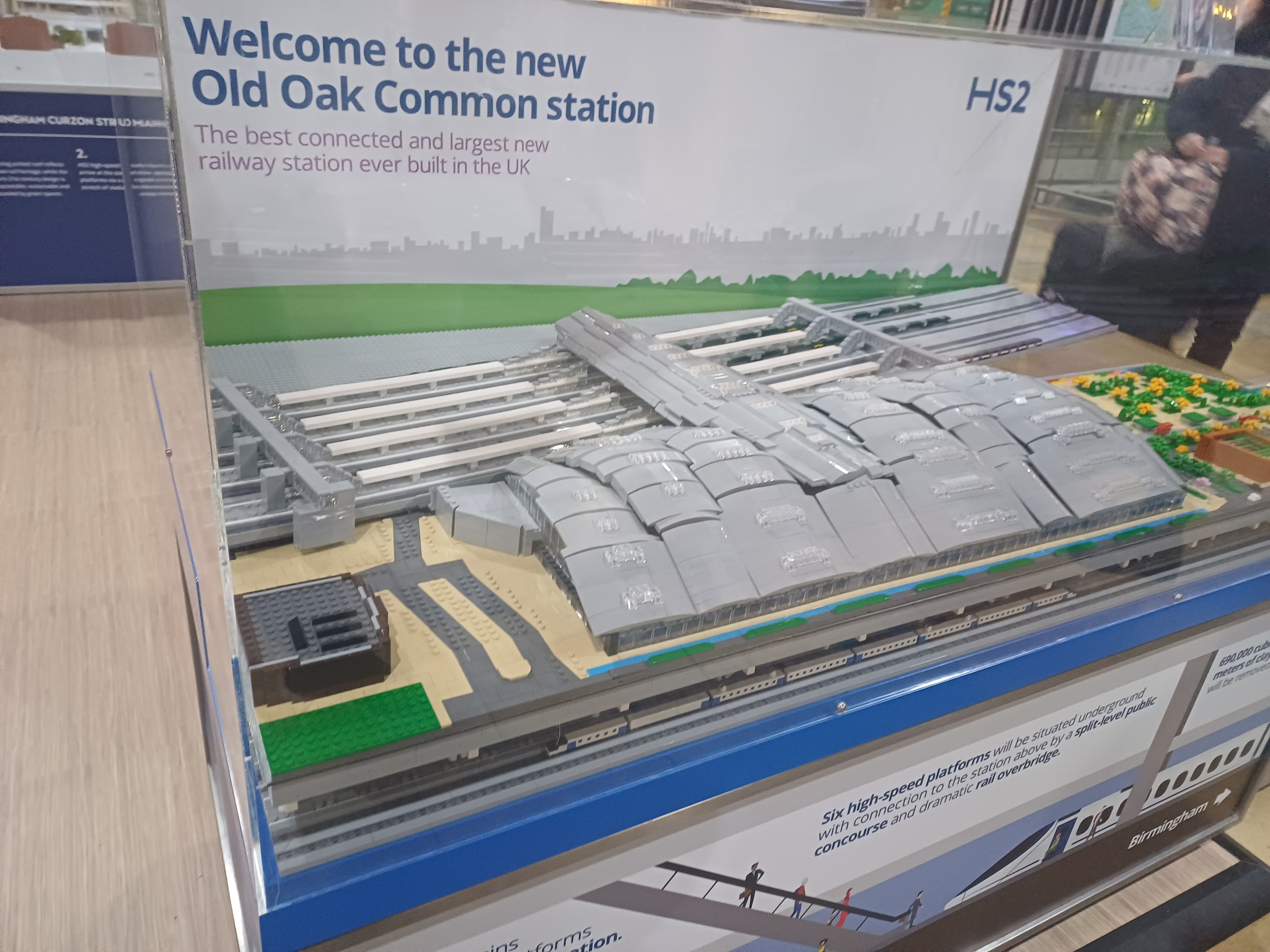
- A Lego model of the planned Old Oak Common Station, which HS2 displayed at London Paddington station in December 2024
- Interactive map of Old Oak Common

General information
- Location: Old Oak Common
- Local authority: London Borough of Hammersmith and Fulham
- Owner: Network Rail; Transport for London
- Number of platforms: 14
- Accessible: Yes

Other information
- Coordinates: 51.5249°N 0.2467°W

Old Oak Common (OOC) is a railway station under construction on the site of the Old Oak Common traction maintenance depot, in Old Oak Common, west London, England. It lies approximately 500 m (1,600 ft) south of Willesden Junction station. When built, it is expected to be one of the largest rail hubs in London, at about 800 m (2,600 ft) in length and 20 m (66 ft) below surface level.

The new station is part of the High Speed 2 (HS2) line from London to Birmingham. The surrounding area, including possible above-station development, is controlled by the Old Oak and Park Royal Development Corporation which was set up in April 2015.

The station will provide a major transport interchange with several other main line and commuter rail services, including the Elizabeth line and the Great Western Main Line. The HS2 line will be below ground level at the Old Oak Common site, with the parallel Great Western Main Line tracks on the surface to the south.

== Site and design ==
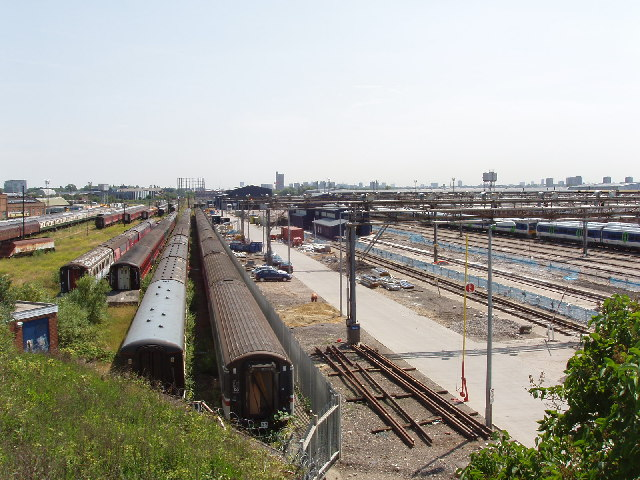
The view east over Old Oak Common TMD in 2005

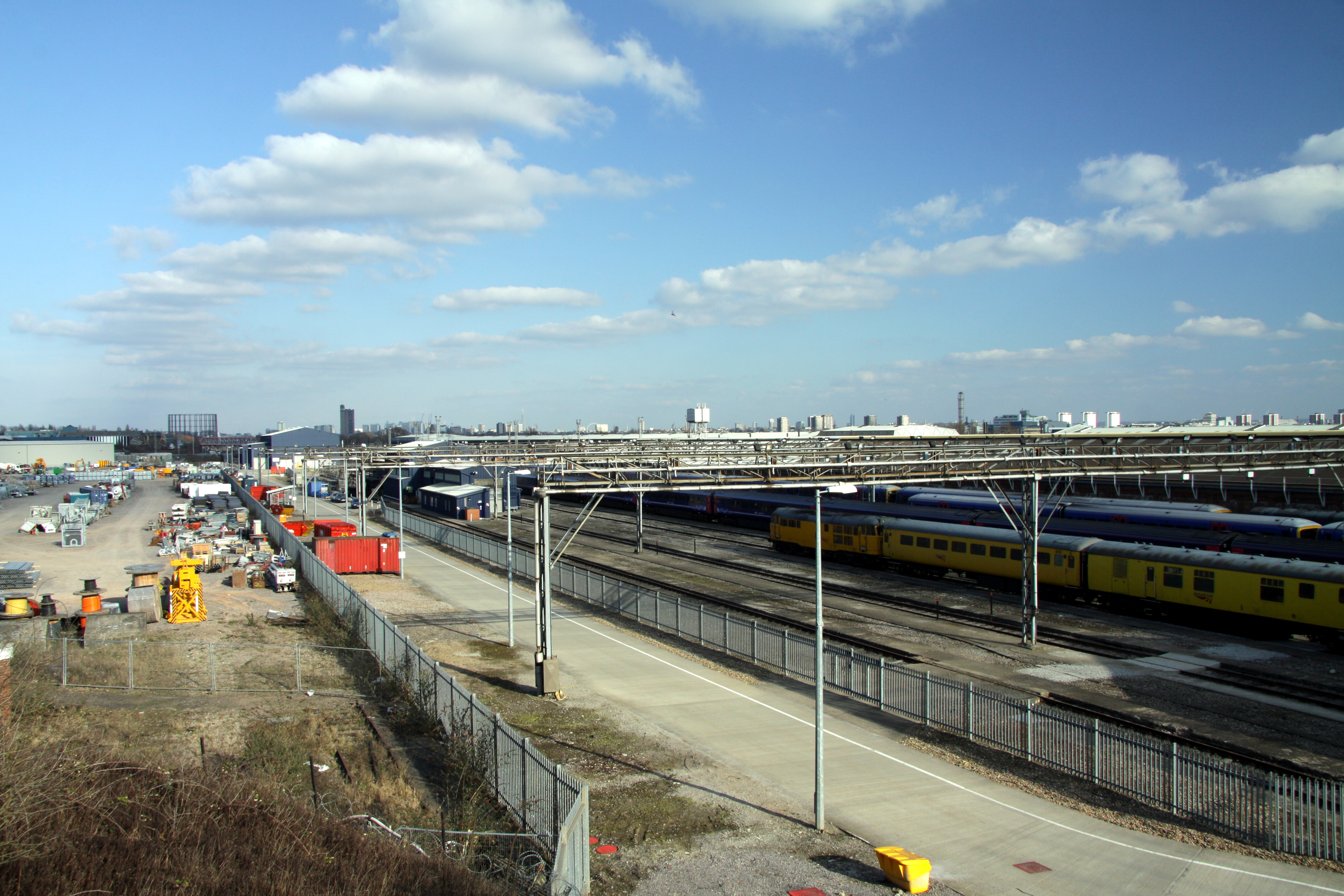
The same view as seen in 2013

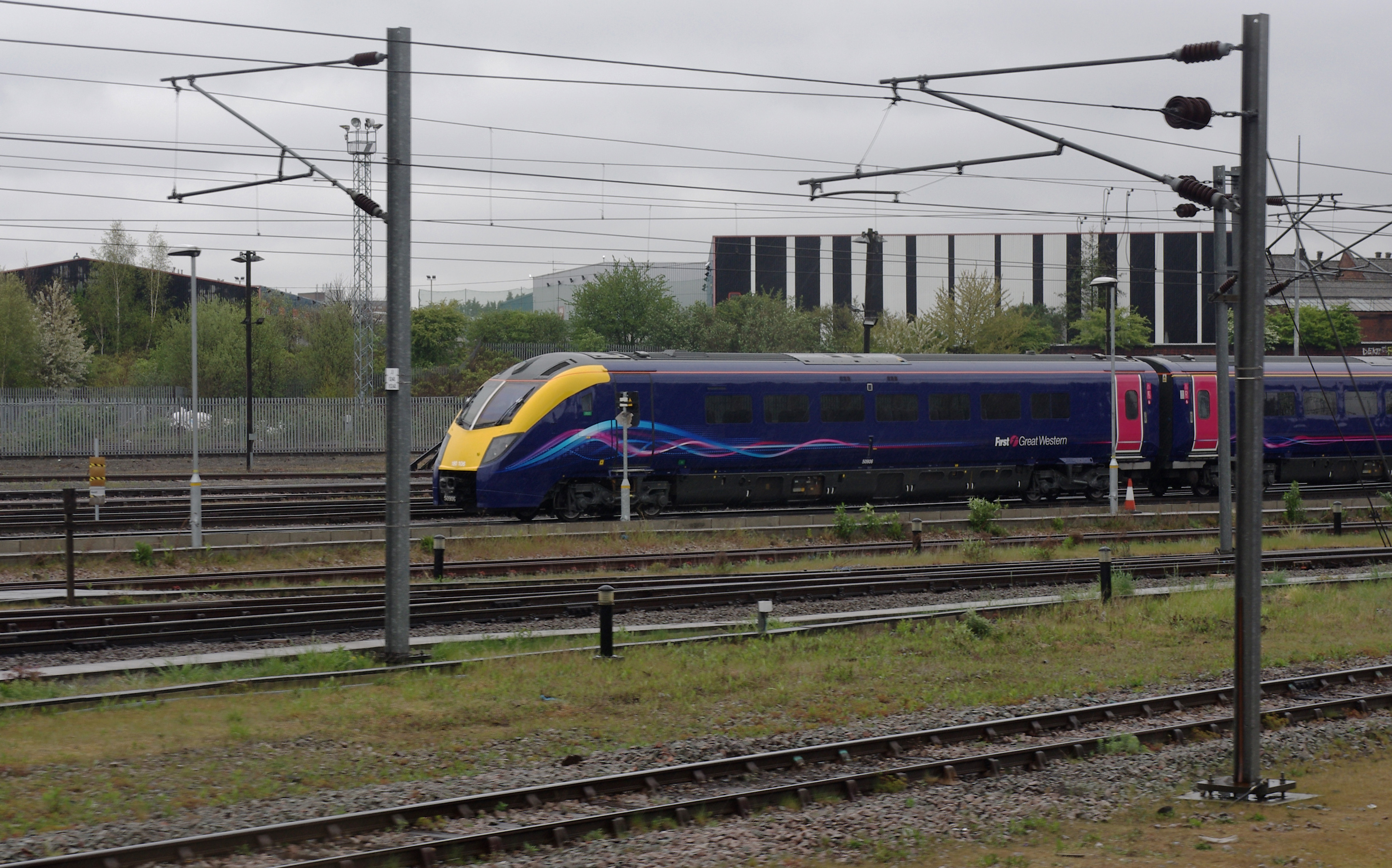
The Great Western Main Line passes through Old Oak Common

The site of the Old Oak Common interchange station is to the north of Wormwood Scrubs and the south of Willesden Junction in West London, alongside the existing Great Western Main Line. The site formerly contained the EWS train maintenance site to the north, which was converted into a construction equipment marshalling area for the Crossrail project. Also on the site are the Elizabeth line's Old Oak Common Traction Maintenance Depot and the Great Western Railway North Pole depot for Intercity Express Programme trains.

The new High Speed 2 station at Old Oak Common is planned to act as a catalyst for the regeneration of this neglected part of West London, acting as a gateway to the development of a new neighbourhood adjacent to the site, creating tens of thousands of new homes, and integrated into the local area through urban design that maximises green space and the station's connection with local bus, cycling and walking routes.

The "super-hub" station will have 14 platforms. There will be six 450 m (1,480 ft) high-speed platforms, built underground, which will connect with eight conventional rail platforms at ground level serving the Great Western Main Line towards the West Country and Wales, Heathrow Express, as well as integrating the east–west Elizabeth line services. It will have 44 escalators and 52 lifts, and will have a naturally-lit concourse to create a pleasing passenger experience while reducing energy consumption. A 25,000 m^{2} (270,000 sq ft) atrium roof, inspired by the site's industrial heritage, will link the two halves of the station, and carry solar panels. The escalators linking the concourse to the platforms approximately 13 m (44 ft) below will be the longest on the HS2 network. It is estimated that the station will serve 250,000 passengers per day and will ultimately connect London to Birmingham via high speed rail.

== Construction ==
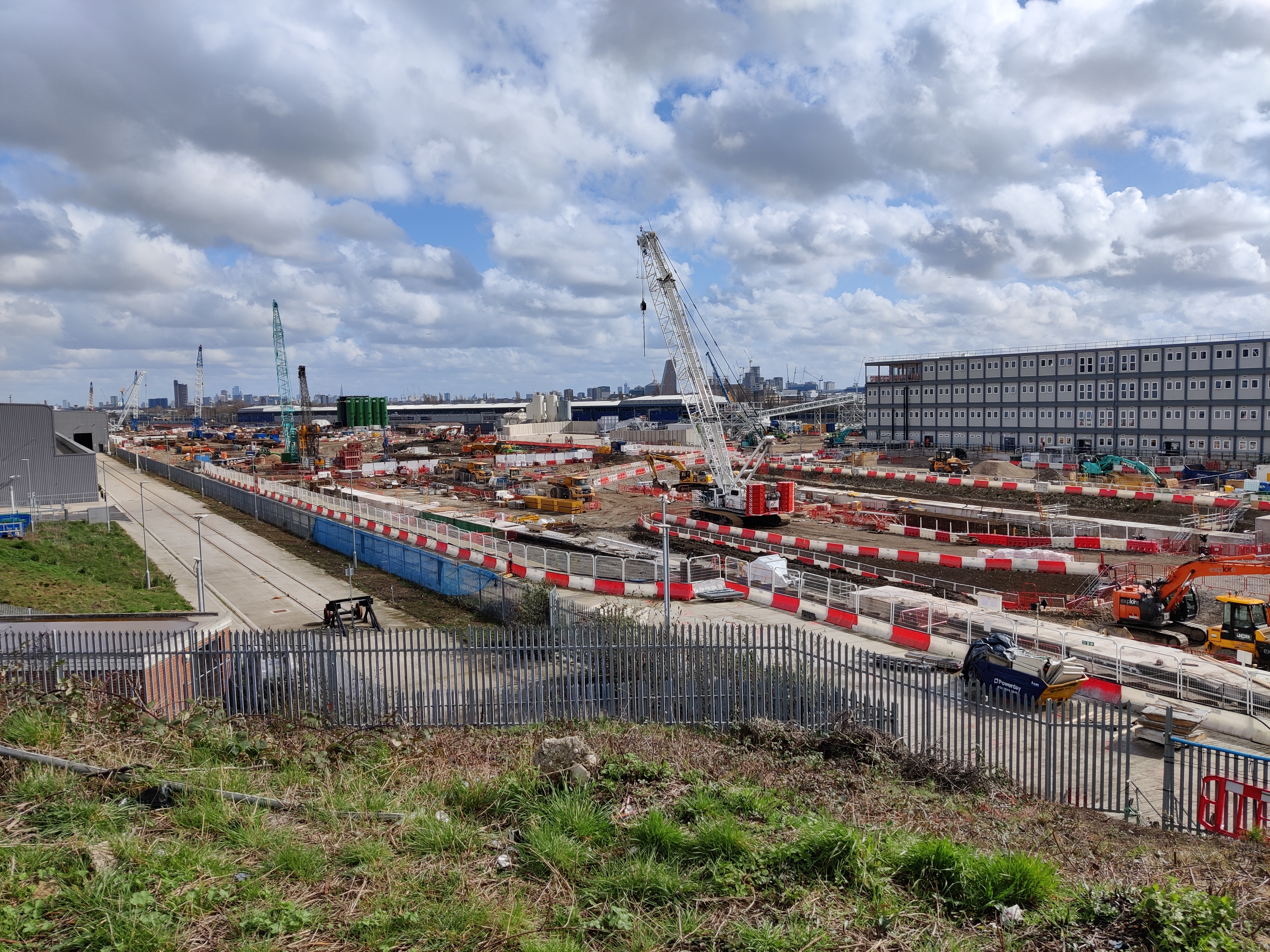
Old Oak Common station under construction in March 2022

Construction is covered by the High Speed Rail (London - West Midlands) Act 2017. This hybrid bill conferred powers to construct and maintain phase 1, including intermediate stations.

The delivery of OOC is a joint venture between Balfour Beatty, Taylor Woodrow Construction and SYSTRA, which was awarded in September 2019.

The station received renewed Government backing in April 2020 following the Oakervee Review, which allowed work to begin on removing 900,000 m^{3} (1,200,000 cu yd) of London Clay to create the space required for the 1 km-long (0.6 mi) rectangular station box at a depth of 20 m (66 ft). The piling alone will require the removal of a further 175,000 m^{3} (229,000 cu yd), making a total of more than 1,000,000 m^{3} (1,300,000 cu yd) of excavated material.

To overcome the site's limited access along the single-carriageway Old Oak Common Lane, and reduce lorry movements across London, a 1 km-long (0.6 mi) conveyor belt was assembled to transport the excavated material to Willesden Euro Terminal railhead, to be removed by rail freight and then recycled. At its peak, there will be 1,500 workers building the station.

=== Timeline ===
Groundwork started on the site in 2019, following the completion of the consultation opened in February 2019. In May 2020, the station gained planning permission. In June 2020, sheet piling commenced on site and the main works contractor for the station started work.

Permanent works began on site in June 2021, starting with the construction of 1.8 km-long (1.1 mi) underground walls which will form the underground station box for the HS2 platforms, the excavation of which completed in 2024.

As of August 2024, the station roof is planned to start construction in 2025 and the installation of high-speed rail systems and track will begin in 2026. The first high-speed platforms were installed in 2025.

== Planned services ==
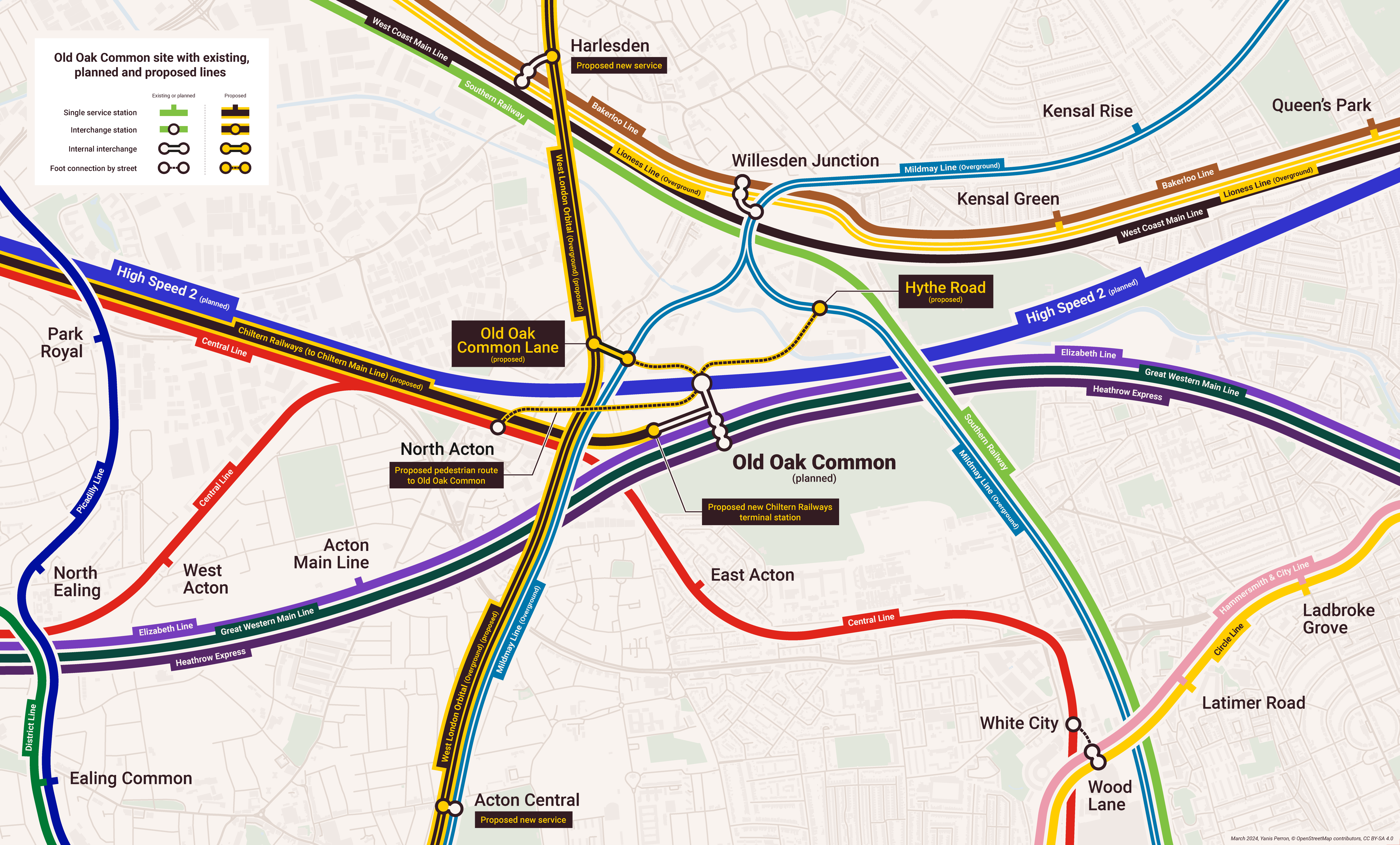
Old Oak Common site in relation to existing lines at Willesden Junction; proposed Overground option "C" (2016)

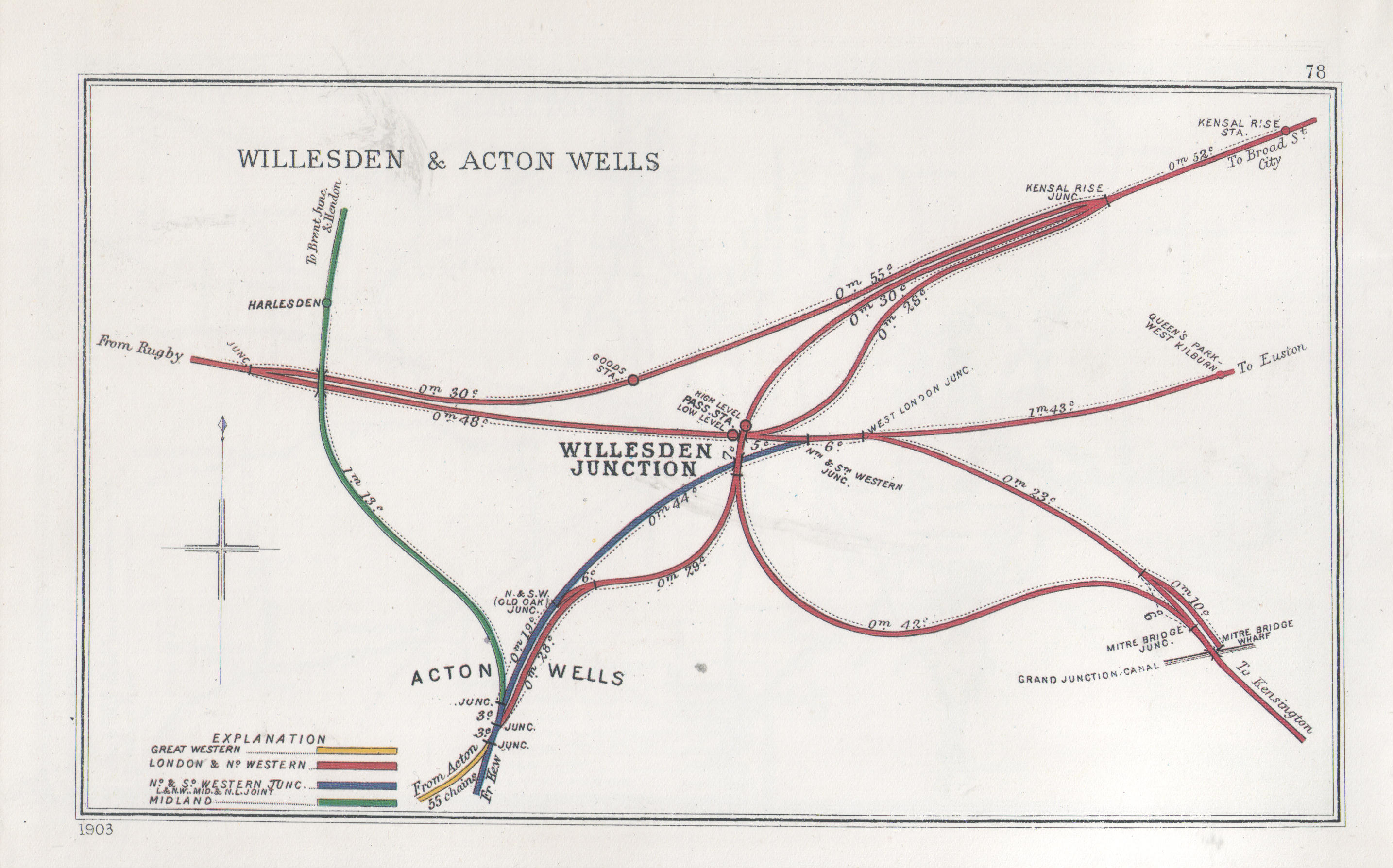
Lines around Willesden & Acton Wells (1914 diagram)

The following table illustrates the planned range of services, based on current DfT documentation on the station, additional proposed serves are described in the following sub-sections.

The business case, released in 2020, suggests that every HS2 service that calls at London Euston will also call at Old Oak Common.

Planned routes
Preceding station	Elizabeth line	Following station
Acton Main Line towards Reading or Heathrow Airport Terminal 4 or Terminal 5	Elizabeth line	Paddington towards Abbey Wood or Shenfield
Preceding station	Great British Railways	Following station
Birmingham Interchange or Stafford or Preston or Crewe or Wilmslow or Stockport	High Speed 2	London Euston
Slough or Reading	Great Western Main Line	London Paddington

Journey times from Old Oak Common to Euston will be five minutes and to Birmingham Curzon Street 31 minutes.

=== Interchange proposals ===
Owing to the proximity of the Old Oak Common site to other lines, it has been suggested that further connections could be made with commuter rail services. The 2010 DfT command paper highlights opportunities for interchanges at Old Oak Common with London Underground, London Overground, and West London line services between East Croydon and Watford Junction.

Proposed interchange
Service	Interchange	Status
London Overground; Mildmay line	Old Oak Common Lane	Proposed new station on North London line
London Overground; Mildmay line	Hythe Road	Proposed new station on West London line
London Overground; West London Orbital	Old Oak Common Lane	Proposed new station and route
Chiltern Railways; Chiltern Main Line via Acton–Northolt line	Old Oak Lane Halt	Proposed new terminal station and route
Southern; West London Route	Not specified	Proposal not supported
London Underground; Central line	North Acton station	Existing station

==== Transit systems ====
An early report prepared in 2011 for the Borough of Hammersmith & Fulham by Terry Farrell & Partners explored several interchange possibilities and proposed the construction of an overhead light rail, automated people mover or personal rapid transit system linking "Old Oak Central" [sic] with North Acton, Kensal Green and Willesden Junction stations. However, as of 2018, no actual proposals exist to create an interchange with these lines.

==== London Overground stations ====
Transport for London (TfL) considered several options for creating an interchange with London Overground, including a combined North London/West London Line station on the southern side of the site, adjacent to Wormwood Scrubs, and two separate stations located to the south (West London Line) and to the west (North London Line) of the site.

In October 2017, TfL began a public consultation on the construction of two new Overground stations.

The consultation concluded that two separate London Overground stations ("Option C") on the Old Oak Common site would be the preferred option: Old Oak Common Lane on the North London line would be built to the west of the main station, and Hythe Road on the West London line would be located east of the station, near Scrubs Lane.

In September 2017, a proposal was made for a new West London Orbital from Hounslow to Hendon using the disused Dudding Hill Line. If the scheme were to go ahead, London Overground services would run via Old Oak Common station located at Victoria Road and other new stations at Brent Cross West and Harlesden. Four trains per hour would run from Hendon to Hounslow and another service from Hendon to Kew Bridge via Old Oak Common. As of July 2019, the scheme was being considered by TfL.

==== Chiltern Main Line connection ====
Network Rail has proposed that the Chiltern Main Line should have a second terminal at Old Oak Common to increase capacity on the route as there is no room to expand the station at Marylebone. To do so, services would use the Acton–Northolt line (formerly the "New North Main Line") with some Chiltern trains possibly terminating at Old Oak Common rather than at London Marylebone.

A 2017 Network Rail report on the long term plans for the Chiltern Line, included an option of providing additional platforms at Old Oak Common station area as a relief for Marylebone, with upgrading of the Acton-Northolt Line.

==== High Speed 1 ====
Although the 2010 DfT proposal for HS2 outlined a number of other possible transport links at Old Oak Common, including the addition of a direct link with the High Speed 1 route to Mainland European services via the Channel Tunnel, it was removed following the Higgins Review

==== Southern ====
Services operated by Southern running between Watford Junction and East Croydon pass through the Old Oak Common site. The line will pass the planned location of Hythe Road Overground station to join the West London Line at Mitre Bridge, approximately 500 metres (550 yd) to the east of the Old Oak Common station site. TfL have stated that it will not be possible to construct platforms to accommodate Southern trains and that an interchange will not be provided.

== Other proposals ==
The construction company Parsons Brinckerhoff submitted a detailed plan to High Speed 2 which included West London Line, North London Line, West Coast Main Line and Dudding Hill Line platforms, although this pre-dated the announcement of the HS2 London terminus such that their proposed alignment would not be possible.

Network Rail's London and South East Route Utilisation Strategy published in 2011 examines the possibility of constructing a chord through the Old Oak Common area to connect Crossrail to the West Coast Main Line. The report notes that a proportion of trains on the Elizabeth line service are planned to terminate at Paddington, and that a new western branch of Crossrail would enable those services to continue on towards Watford Junction and beyond. The proposed link would also relieve pressure on Euston station by diverting WCML suburban trains onto the Crossrail route instead of terminating at Euston.

A separate proposal promoted by the Campaign for Better Transport advocacy group, the North and West London Light Railway, suggests running a light rail line past the Old Oak Common site between Ealing Broadway and Brent Cross. This scheme is not, however, supported by any government plans.

== Political support ==
The Old Oak Common plans were unveiled two months before the 2010 United Kingdom general election by the Labour government. While the Conservative/Liberal Democrat administration supported the HS2 project, the Conservative Party indicated a preference to an alternative proposal, put forward by Arup, for the HS2 line to go directly to a hub station at Heathrow Airport. Under this scheme, the west London interchange would be situated at Heathrow rather than at Old Oak Common. Conservative MP Theresa Villiers (the former Minister of State for Transport) referred to the Old Oak Common scheme as "Wormwood Scrubs International", and criticised it on account of its distance from the airport and the inconvenience to airport passengers having to change trains. When he was Mayor of London, Boris Johnson was non-committal in supporting the Old Oak Common site, and takes the view that further evaluation is required.

When asked about a High Speed Rail – Crossrail interchange at Old Oak Common, the Transport Secretary Philip Hammond stated "Lug your heavy bags down a couple of escalators along 600 metres [660 yards] of corridor and then change trains at a wet suburban station somewhere in north west London. That is not an option.".

The Old Oak Common plans are supported by the London Borough of Hammersmith and Fulham.

Lord Mawhinney, a former Conservative MP for Peterborough, concluded that the London High Speed 2 terminus should be at Old Oak Common, not at Euston. That was because of tunnelling costs and possible fast turnaround times at Old Oak Common.

In summer 2011, Hammersmith and Fulham Council launched a wider 'Park Royal City' plan for Old Oak Common, including light rail or personal rapid transit lines to the surrounding areas.
