= Old Oak Common Lane railway station =

Proposed railway station in London, England

Old Oak Common Lane
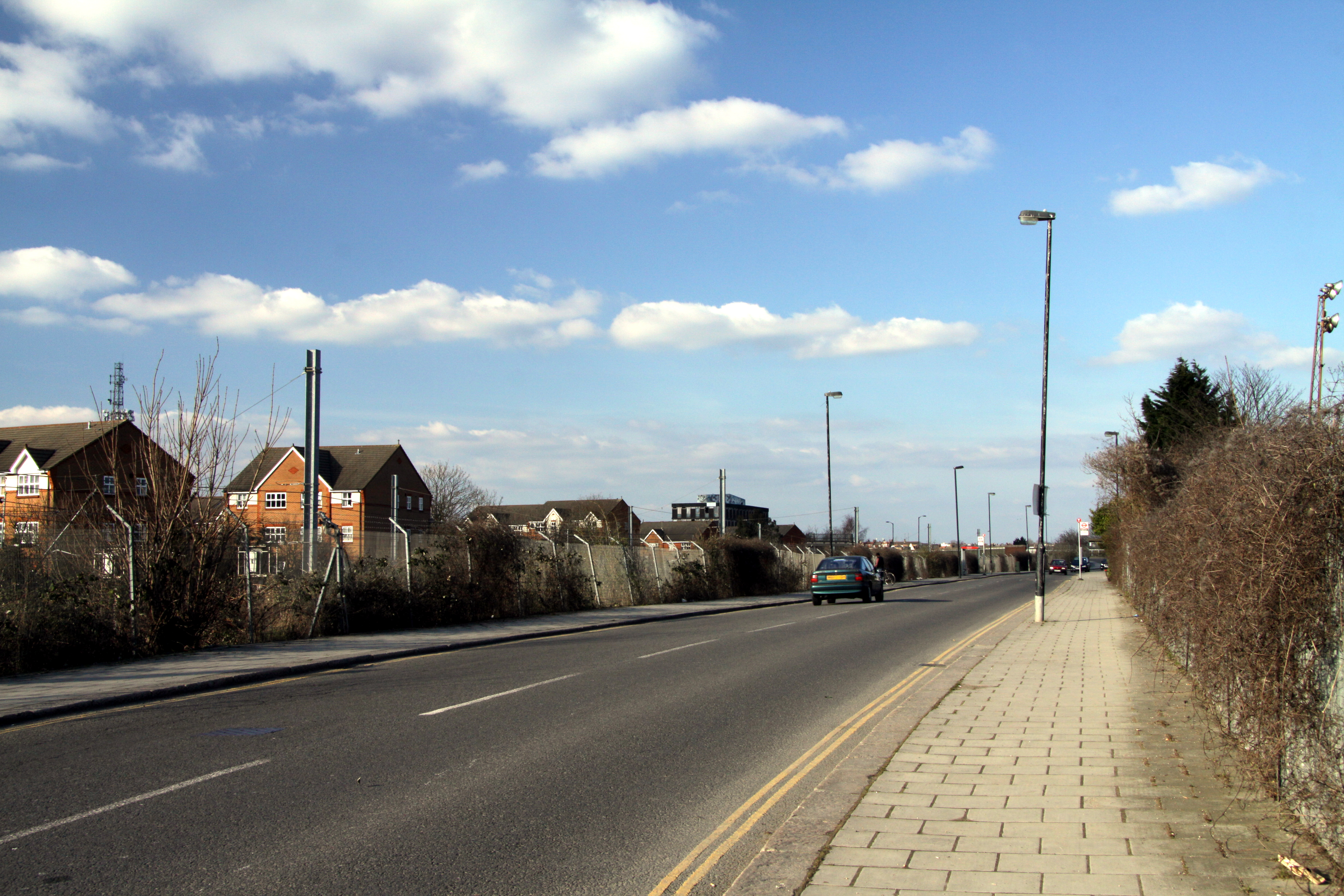
- Future site of Old Oak Common Lane station
- Interactive map of Old Oak Common Lane

General information
- Location: Old Oak Common
- Local authority: London Borough of Hammersmith and Fulham
- Managed by: London Overground
- Owner: Network Rail
- Number of platforms: 2
- Accessible: Yes

Other information
- Coordinates: 51.52642°N 0.25189°W

Old Oak Common Lane railway station is a proposed railway station in the London Borough of Hammersmith and Fulham. If constructed, it will be situated on the North London line, between Acton Central and Willesden Junction. It will be a stop on the Mildmay line and on the proposed West London Orbital, part of the London Overground commuter rail. Old Oak Common Lane station would be situated about 400 yards (350 metres) to the west of the under-construction Old Oak Common railway station and will offer interchange between London Overground and other rail services, including National Rail (Great Western Railway), Elizabeth line and High Speed 2. It is one of two proposed new stations which will connect with Old Oak Common, the other being Hythe Road on the West London line.

== Proposals ==
Old Oak Common Lane station would be located about 350 metres (1,150 ft) to the west of the main Crossrail station on Old Oak Common Lane. It is also planned to construct a footbridge to give access to the station from Victoria Road (A4000 road) via Midland Terrace. Interchange with the Crossrail station will be determined by the design of the new Old Oak Common station. Under the Transport and Works Act 1992, the project will be subject to a Transport and Works Act Order (TWAO) and governmental funding if construction is to proceed. The scheme would also be examined at a public inquiry before it could be approved by the Secretary of State for Transport.

In October 2017, Transport for London began a public consultation on the construction of two new Overground stations, Hythe Road on the West London line and Old Oak Common Lane on the North London line. In December 2018, TfL stated that the construction of the two stations would be heavily dependent on securing government funding.

Station proposals

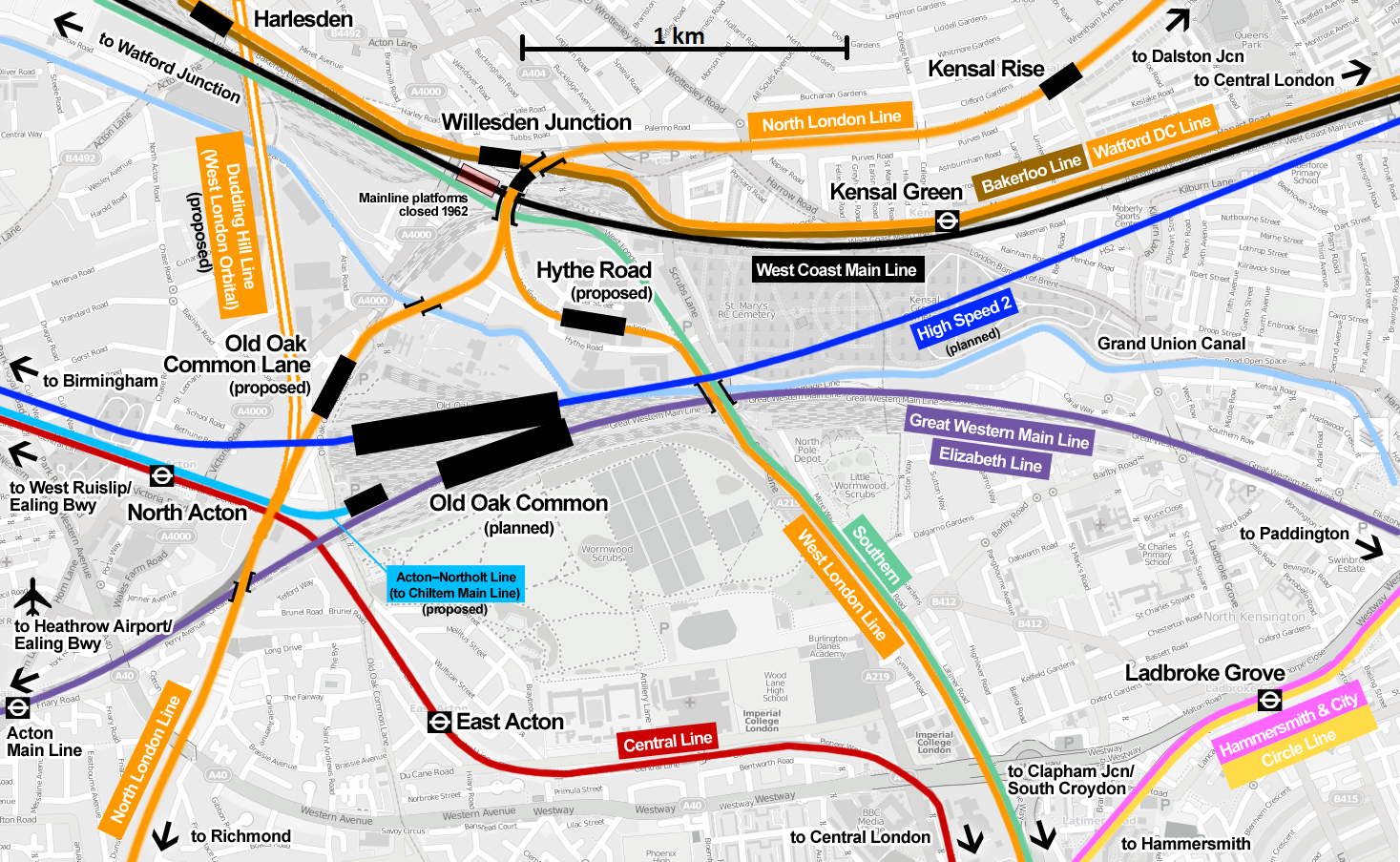
Map of the Old Oak Common proposals

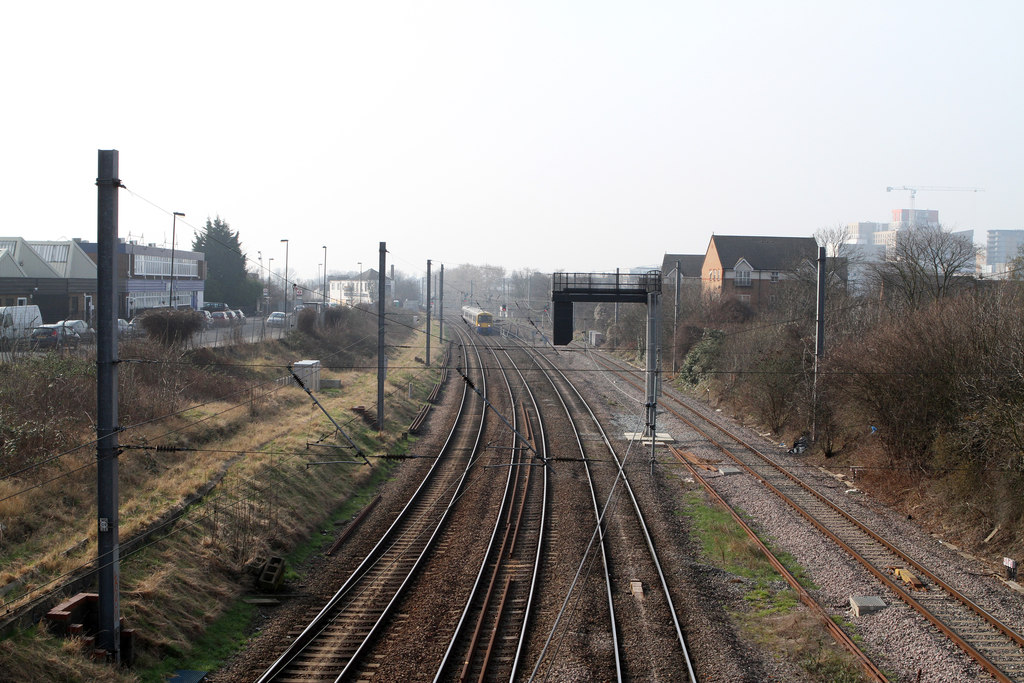
The future site of the station (viewed from Old Oak Common Lane bridge)

== Planned services ==
Old Oak Common Lane would be served by London Overground Mildmay line trains running on the North London line between Acton Central and Willesden Junction.

Additionally, a new London Overground is being proposed to run between Hendon and Hounslow via Old Oak Common Lane. This scheme, known as the West London Orbital, would involve re-opening the Dudding Hill freight line to passenger services. New platforms on this line would be constructed adjacent to Victoria Road, with a new pedestrian bridge proving access to Old Oak Common Lane and the main Old Oak Common interchange station.

Future services
Preceding station	London Overground	Following station
Acton Central towards Richmond	Mildmay line North London line	Willesden Junction towards Stratford
