= OPDC =

OPDC may refer to:

- Old Oak and Park Royal Development Corporation, a development corporation in London, England
- Oil Products Distribution Company, part of the Ministry of Oil in Iraq
- Office of the Public Sector Development Commission, governmental agency in Thailand
