= Public Library and Other Stories =

2015 short story collection by Ali Smith

- First edition
- Author: Ali Smith
- Cover artist: Still from La Chinoise, a 1967 film by Jean-Luc Godard
- Language: English
- Publisher: Hamish Hamilton
- Publication date: Nov 2015
- Publication place: United Kingdom
- Media type: Print
- Pages: 220
- ISBN: 0-241-23746-7

Public Library and Other Stories is a short story collection by Scottish author Ali Smith, published in 2015. The fourth story in the collection, "The Beholder", was shortlisted for the Sunday Times Short Story Award.

It contains 12 stories punctuated by reflections on libraries, "about their history, their importance and the recent spate of closures".

== Stories ==
- ~~Library~~ (online text) just off Covent Garden, which is no longer a library
- "Last" - The narrator spots a wheelchair-user trapped in a railway carriage after it has been parked in the sidings for the day and with various etymological asides, comes to her rescue.
  that beautiful new build - Ali Smith's partner Sarah Wood tells of her childhood experiences of the local library.
- "Good voice" (online text) A woman in Inverness talks to her dead father about the World Wars, with reference to a 1917 photograph of executions, recordings made of British accents by a German linguist in a World War I POW camp, and a book of World War I poetry.
  opened by mark twain - Kensal Rise Library and librarian Pat Hunter tells of her life.
- "The beholder" - A woman has difficulty breathing and is diagnosed with depression but then discovers a woody lump on her chest which grows into a rosebush, specifically 'Young Lycidas' a David Austin cultivar named after John Milton's poem Lycidas on the 400th anniversary of his birth.
  a clean, well-lighted place - a discussion on libraries with Kate Atkinson and her daughter Helen Clyne.
- "The poet" - the life of Olive Fraser, recipient of the Chancellor's Gold Medal in 1935.
  the ideal model of society as explained by Sophie Mayer
- "The human claim" (online text) - The author reflects on the whereabouts of D. H. Lawrence's ashes as documented in John Worthen's biography, and discovers a fraudulent purchase of a Lufthansa ticket on her Barclaycard.
  soon to be sold - on the closure of libraries, and Lesley Bryce's recollections of Corstorphine Library
- "The ex-wife" - the narrator talks of their girlfriend's obsession with Katherine Mansfield which leads to their break-up, then the narrator is spoken to by Mansfield's ghost.
  put a price on that - poetry by Jackie Kay, Anna Ridley tells of borrowing Sade's Justine at age 13, with further experiences from Clare Jennings, Emma Wilson and Natalie Williams.
- "The art of elsewhere" (online text podcast) - A woman yearns to be 'elsewhere'
  on bleak house road - Kamila Shamsie remembers the British Council library in Karachi.
- "After life" The local paper mistakenly reports on the death of the narrator, then ten years later repeats the mistake, but this time is not so quick in acknowledging its mistake.
  curve tracing - Eve Lacey shows the author round Newnham College, Cambridge Library
- "The definite article" - A walk through Regent's Park with historical and literary asides
  the library sunlight - Miriam Toews spies her mother asleep in Toronto Library
- "Grass" Inspired by a book of Robert Herrick poetry, the author remembers working in her father's Inverness shop when a young girl attempts to buy a toaster using wild flowers as payment
  the making of me - Helen Oyeyemi talks of the link between Deptford, Lewisham and Catford libraries
- "Say I won't be there" (online text) - the narrators recurring dream in which their father tells his family he has seen Dusty Springfield
  the infinite possibilities - Anna Wood on a rural Northumberland library, Richard Popple on library closures and Sarah Wood on her inability to throw away her mother's library card.
- "And so on" - Reflections on death

== Reception ==
- Kate Kellaway in The Guardian praises the book as "a brilliant, comprehensive, unpredictable defence of public libraries. It is also a collection of stories characterised by an imaginative freedom underpinned by her reading...Texts, emails, recorded voices, Google, iPlayer are conspicuous in these stories – sometimes comically unhelpful, always distracting. Smith is mindful of language as living thing not as recorded message – collectively owned....She revels in changing usages of words (she gives a mini-tutorial on 'buxom' and 'stamina') and the unfixedness of language" and concludes: "What these marvellous stories also, appropriately, do is make one want to go to a library in pursuit of the books mentioned. She is such a generous writer – this book, like a library itself, has a communal feel. She likes to welcome others under her roof: it is a book full of buried hints and encouragements."
- Francesca Wade in the Financial Times concludes: "Each of Smith's stories is a gem: fast-paced and incongruous, every situation made immediately intriguing by deft detail and sharply humorous dialogue. Throughout the book runs a wry impatience with the vagaries of modern officialdom, from the 'matey automaton' on the phone who can't understand the command 'I'd like to speak to someone', to the security system at a newspaper that tells a man standing outside that he's on record as being dead, and that they'll need photographic proof of ID and a verification meeting with the news group's lawyers before they'll accept otherwise. This same faceless bureaucracy, with its emphasis on efficiency and streamlining over joy and common sense, is destroying library services. Let's hope that those responsible will read this collection and be distracted from their thankless task."
- Allan Massie in The Scotsman is effusive, finishing with: "As Housman put it, 'poetry is not the thing said, but the way of saying it.' Ali Smith’s way of doing so is wonderful. Her prose dances. Her imagination lights up life and experience. This is a book to read slowly, to savour its vitality and variety, one to return to and find new pleasures with each reading."
- Sameer Rahim in The Telegraph does have some misgivings, though: "Reading this collection is like spending an afternoon in a well-stocked library in the company of an erudite and playful companion. Smith delights in making unexpected connections. This can make for an amusing and insightful reading experience, but sometimes feels slightly cobbled together."
