= Hythe Road railway station =

Proposed railway station in West London

Hythe Road
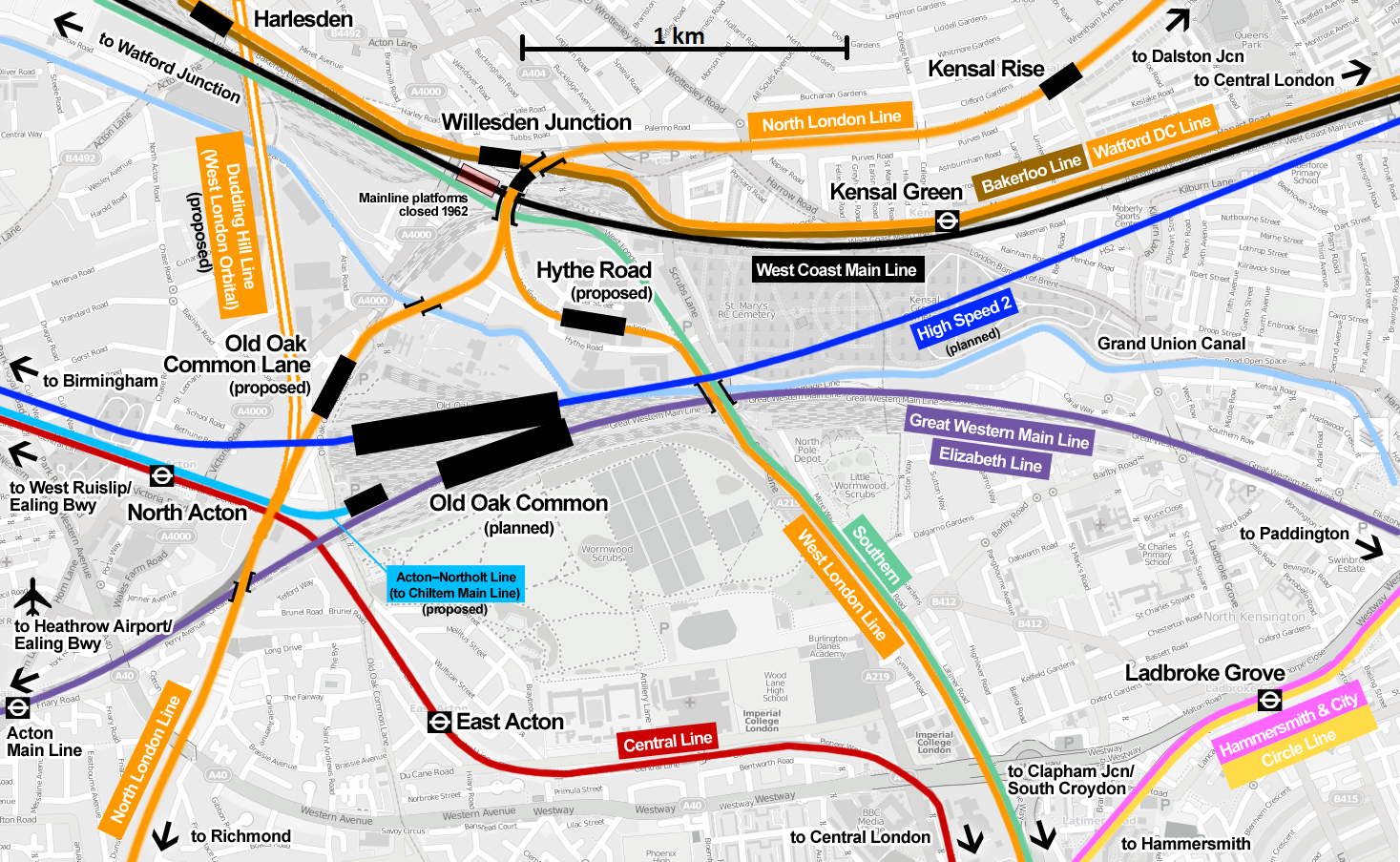
- Map of the Old Oak Common development proposals, showing the future site of Hythe Road station

- Location of Hythe Road in Greater London
- Location: Old Oak Common
- Local authority: London Borough of Hammersmith and Fulham
- Managed by: London Overground
- Owner: Network Rail
- Number of platforms: 3
- Accessible: Yes

Key dates
- 2026: Opening

Other information
- Coordinates: 51.5281188°N 0.2416547°W

Hythe Road railway station is a proposed railway station in West London, UK. If constructed, it will be situated on the West London line, between Shepherd's Bush and Willesden Junction, as part of the London Overground commuter rail system. It will be located next to the planned Old Oak Common railway station and will offer interchange between London Overground and other rail services, including Crossrail (the Elizabeth Line) and High Speed 2. It is one of two proposed new stations which will connect with Old Oak Common, the other being Old Oak Common Lane on the North London line.

As of December 2018, TfL's most recent position is that

subject to funding being secured and further public consultation, we would seek permission to build and operate the proposals via a Transport and Works Act Order (TWAO). Funding remains a significant constraint in delivering these proposals. We are currently seeking to establish a package of funding that could enable the stations to be delivered by 2026 alongside the new HS2 and Elizabeth line station.

— Transport for London, December 2018

== Proposals ==
Hythe Road railway station would be situated about 700 metres (770 yards) from the mainline Old Oak Common station. Construction work would involve re-aligning the track along a new railway embankment (built slightly to the north of the existing line) and demolishing industrial units along Salter Street, on land currently owned by a vehicle sales company ('Car Giant'). The station structure will sit on a viaduct, with a bus interchange underneath. The station will incorporate 3 platforms, allowing through services between Stratford and Clapham Junction with an additional bay platform to accommodate terminating services from Clapham Junction.

In October 2017, Transport for London began a public consultation on the construction of two new Overground stations, Hythe Road on the West London line and Old Oak Common Lane on the North London line.

Proposed services
Preceding station	London Overground	Following station
Willesden Junction towards Stratford	Mildmay line West London line	Shepherd's Bush towards Clapham Junction
