= Mayhew (animal welfare charity) =

Charity in London, England that promotes animal welfare

The Mayhew Animal Home & Humane Education Centre
- Founded: 1886; 140 years ago
- Location(s): Kensal Green; London, NW10; United Kingdom

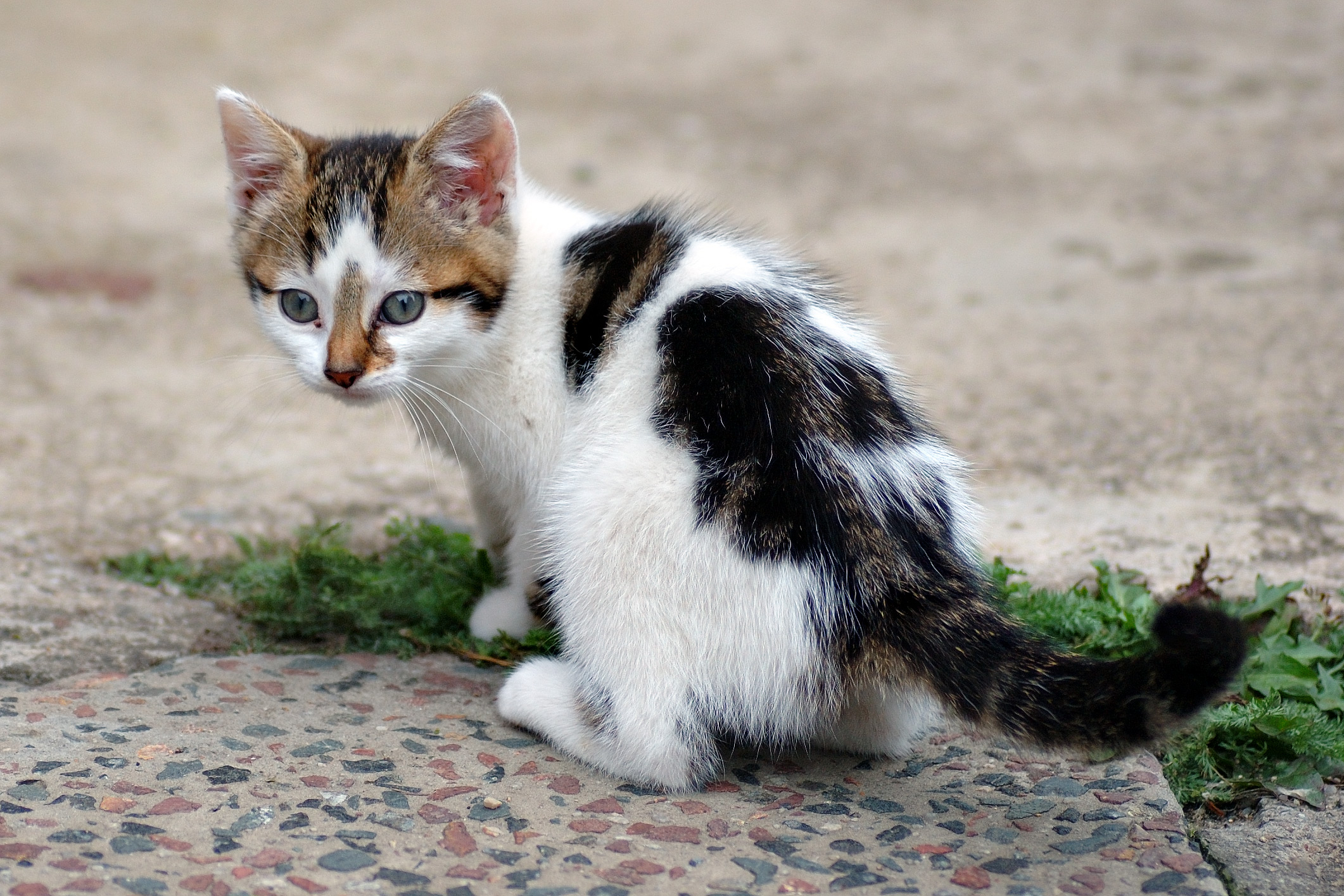
The Mayhew helps to rehome abandoned cats and kittens

The Mayhew, formerly the Mayhew Animal Home & Humane Education Centre is a charity in London, England that promotes animal welfare. It was established in 1886 and is now one of the busiest animal sanctuaries in London, rescuing hundreds of animals each year. The charities mission is "To promote animal welfare by delivering a broad range of community-based veterinary, care and education services in the UK and overseas".

The Mayhew relies entirely on charitable donations, in order to rescue cats and dogs, provide animal rehoming services, to run TheraPaws (a scheme where volunteers take behaviourally assessed dogs into hospitals, special educational needs schools, care homes, mental health centres and hospices so people can interact with and enjoy the animals), works to ensure that homeless people can stay with their pets and provides pet supplies to people in need.

== History ==
The Mayhew was started in 1886 by the Bell Family, who also established the Vegetarian Society. They aimed to help "the lost and starving dogs and cats of London so that they should have sanctuary from the cold inhumanity they are being dealt outside". The Mayhew rehomed animals considered to be hard to find homes for, such as elderly cats. The Mayhew had to be rescued themselves, by the RSPCA in 1925, after falling into disrepair. By the 1980's, the RSPCA had found it too expensive to run and it had to be saved by the people that ran the charity and the board of Trustees.

The Mayhew is actively involved in campaigns such as supporting National Dog Adoption Month. 2014 saw actress Joanna Lumley visit the centre, to meet dalmatian dogs Penny and Purdy who were taken in by the charity, to be rehomed. Dog Adoption Month helps to raise awareness of rescue animals in the UK.

In 2016, it was reported that a 3 year project had culminated in £600,000 being raised, with help from The Marchig Animal Welfare Trust, The Shuman Animal Welfare Trust and Support Adoption for Pets, so the charity could improve their veterinary services by expanding these to incorporate two new well equipped operating theatres.

At Christmas in 2016, The Mayhew reminded people that pets are for life and not just for Christmas, by highlighting the plight of a puppy, Madison, an eight week old Labrador cross, bought online as a present, that subsequently had to be taken in by the charity.

The Mayhew also works abroad. In 2017, Mayhew International began working in Afghanistan to stop dog culling in Kabul, provide a rabies vaccination programme and services to control the dog population, whilst in Tbilisi, Georgia they help to treat injured cats and dogs in shelters and work to provide advice to veterinary students and established vets.

In 2018, pupils at Wendell Park primary school pitched to the Mayor of London and were awarded £1,500, which they chose to donate to The Mayhew, with the funds being used to buy supplies for the animals including food, toys, bowls, and blankets.

The charity has assisted people such as Colin, who became homeless and who turned to the charity for help. The Mayhew provided food for his cats and rehomed their kittens after animal charities saw a significant increase in adoption requests, amongst a cost of living crisis that saw pet food costs increase by 20% in a year.

== Charitable activities ==
The charities activities include:

- Pet Refuge - The Mayhew works to provide care and a home to animals for pet owners when they are in hospital, until they have recovered and can care for their animals again.
- Animal Welfare - They work with non-government agencies and the government to help animals that need to be rehomed or that require care.
- Phobias - They offer help to people with dog phobias, so they can overcome these phobias.
- TheraPaws - Where dogs in The Mayhew and owned by volunteers visit people in places like hospitals and hospices as a form of animal therapy for vulnerable people. Therapy dogs include dogs like Nora, a 2 year old Golden Retriever. Nora visited the Mildmay Mission Hospital in East London, that helps people recover from addictions. A worker at the hospital commented that: “Having Nora visit can be a valuable part of our patient’s rehabilitation. She helps patients to socialise and provides comfort from their anxieties”. Benefits of such therapy include reducing isolation, providing companionship and social interaction, and building confidence. The Mayhew specialise in visiting elderly people with dementia and those receiving palliative care. Research by Middlesex University found that "TheraPaws visits improve the quality of life of care home residents by up to 12%".
- Rehome from Home - A scheme where The Mayhew helps animals that need to be rehomed remain within their current environment, until a suitable new home can be found for them.
- Veterinary Care - Assisting people with low incomes to gain access to preventative veterinary care. The Mayhew has been awarded Cat Friendly Clinic status, which means they provide a high standard of care. The Mayhew has helped animals like stray Aslan, a Norwegian Forest cat, who was found nearby with sore and weeping eyes. The Mayhew's vets discovered Aslan had entropion and provided corrective surgery, cleaned Aslan's teeth and ears, neutered him and provided flea and worm treatment.
- Working with homeless people and their companion animals - The Mayhew staff visit homeless people and their dogs and provide free general health checks, preventative veterinary care, microchipping, warm animal clothing for cold weather, collars, leads and food, whilst working with charities like St Mungo's and Crisis to try and find people and their pets temporary accommodation.
- Neutering - Helping to manage animal populations, by offering low cost or free neutering and running a Trap, Neuter, Return service for feral cats.

== Patrons ==
While involved with the Royal Family, Meghan Markle served as the charity's patron.
