= Kensal Green =

Area of London, England

Coordinates: 51.5308°N 0.2248°W

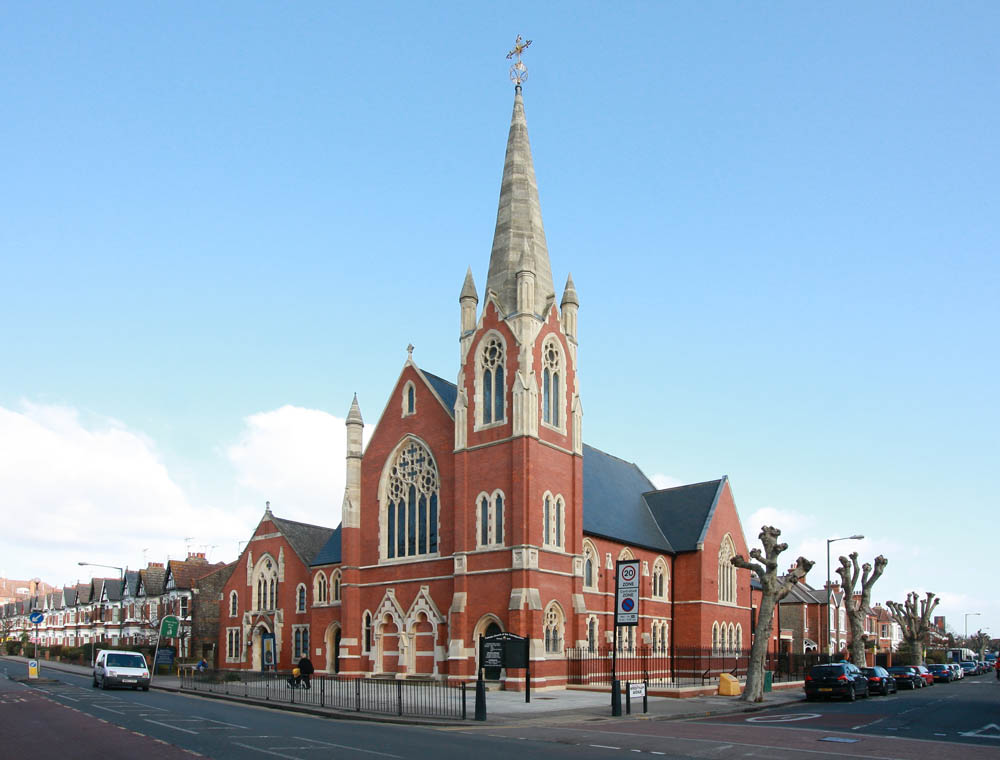
- Church of the Transfiguration, Chamberlayne Road

- Location within Greater London
- Population: 14,915 (2011) (Kensal Green ward)
- OS grid reference: TQ235825
- Ceremonial county: Greater London
- Region: London
- Country: England
- Sovereign state: United Kingdom
- Post town: LONDON
- Postcode district: NW6, NW10
- Postcode district: W10
- Dialling code: 020
- Police: Metropolitan
- Fire: London
- Ambulance: London
- UK Parliament: Queen's Park and Maida Vale

Kensal Green, also known as Kensal Rise, is an area shared between the London Borough of Brent and the Royal Borough of Kensington and Chelsea.

The area is focussed on Harrow Road and situated about 4.4 miles (7.1 km) miles north-west of Charing Cross. Together with Kensal Town, it forms part of the northern part of North Kensington.

To the west lies Harlesden, to the east are Maida Hill and Westbourne. Queen's Park and Brondesbury are to the north-east, Willesden is to the north-west, and Notting Hill lies to the south.

Kensal Green is best known for the Grade I listed Kensal Green Cemetery, one of London's 'Magnificent Seven cemeteries'. The cemetery, which is still used for new burials, includes several chapels and the West London Crematorium.

== Residents and businesses ==
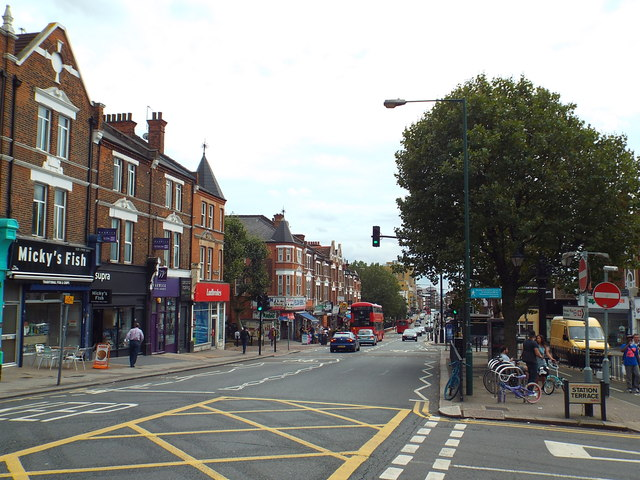
Chamberlayne Road, Kensal Rise

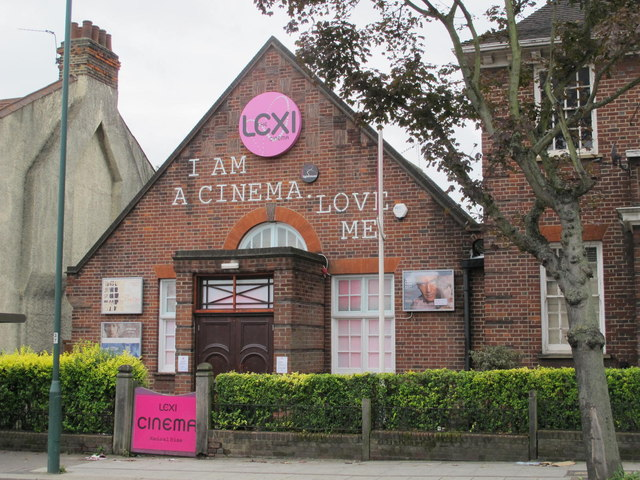
The Lexi Cinema in 2011

As of June 2014, the area had seen significant gentrification, attracting people from surrounding areas such as Notting Hill and Queen's Park. It was characterised by numerous independent stores, restaurants, pubs and cafes, and was earning a reputation as a "celebrity haunt-meets-Nappy Valley."

In 2009, Chamberlayne Road in Kensal Rise was named the "hippest street in Europe" by Vogue magazine. Luxury goods maker Mulberry named its handbag Kensal and launched an advertising campaign with Cara Delevingne. The area is characterised by numerous independent stores, restaurants, pubs, and cafes. There are also various sports clubs, gyms and health studios such as Moberly Sports Centre and Gracelands Yard, as well as nearby Queen's Park. The area also boasts Britain's first independent boutique cinema and social enterprise, The Lexi Cinema. It is staffed by local volunteers and its profits go to an eco-village in South Africa.

It has been home to a number of residents including musicians Paloma Faith and Rita Ora, chef Thomasina Miers, film director, DJs and musicians Don Letts and Mark Rae, actress Thandiwe Newton, singer Lily Allen, model-turned-author Sophie Dahl, author Zadie Smith, David Cameron's ex-strategy guru Steve Hilton, the actor and writer Phoebe Waller-Bridge and Sienna Miller.

It has traditionally been popular with those working in the media and creative industries but those buying properties increasingly include people working in the financial and technology industries, and others moving from nearby Notting Hill in search of more space. The area also attracts Americans thanks to The American School in London in neighbouring St John's Wood, as well as being popular with the French, partly due to a Lycée Français opening in Brent's former town hall.

== Community ==
In 2014 residents successfully campaigned to save its local library after it was sold to a developer. More recently, independent local cinema Lexi raised £141,000 from locals and local businesses for a community hub. The hub was also supported by Brent Council and the Mayor of London.

In 2021 residents of Clifford Gardens successfully campaigned against the asphalting of pavements. They set up a petition and managed to get 544 signatures in a week. When the workmen arrived with lorries and rollers on 20 March they were met by a large crowd of parents with children and buggies blockading the street.

== Open space and public realm ==
Emslie Horniman's Pleasance Park located on Bosworth Road contains tennis courts, five-a-side football pitches and children's playground. Queen's Park features tennis courts, golf, a petting zoo and an extensive children's playground. King Edwards Vll park is within walking distance.

Brent Council announced planned improvements to the public realm in 2019 to enhance the pedestrian experience and reduce traffic. The changes include new cycle lanes, various measures to reduce congestion and an improved public realm with new pavements, carriageway resurfacing, community greening schemes and pocket gardens.

== Transport ==
Kensal Green station (London fare zone 2) on the Bakerloo line is about 20 minutes from Oxford Circus and the West End. London Overground's Lioness line services also operate to London Euston, a journey that takes around 15 minutes. Trains also go to Watford Junction, sharing track with the Bakerloo as far north as Harrow & Wealdstone station.

London Overground Mildmay line services also operate out of Kensal Rise railway station (London fare zone 2) and provides regular services to Richmond in the west, Stratford in the east, and Clapham Junction in the south.

Extensive bus services also run from the area, including routes 18 (Sudbury - Euston via Harrow Road), 6 (Willesden Bus Garage - Victoria station via Queen's Park and Marble Arch), 52 (Willesden Bus Garage - Victoria station via Notting Hill and Kensington), 316 (Brent Cross West - White City bus station), 187 (Central Middlesex Hospital - Finchley Road, O2 Centre), N18 (Harrow Weald Bus Garage - Trafalgar Square via Harrow Road) and N118 (Ruislip - Trafalgar Square via Harrow Road).

Kensal Green is located on the Paddington Arm of the Grand Union Canal (which passes by Kensal Green Cemetery) making it possible to walk and cycle along the canal to Little Venice, the Paddington Basin, Paddington Station and Regents Canal.

In 2020 the Government gave final approval to the High Speed 2 (HS2) train link running from London to Birmingham. This will bring a major HS2 and Crossrail interchange station at Old Oak Common, within walking distance from Kensal Green. It will provide high-speed rail across London and to the Midlands, as well as direct connectivity with the Heathrow Express airport rail link and trains to Wales and the West of England. It will be the largest new railway station ever built in the UK. It was set to open in 2026, however due to numerous delays in construction, it is currently uncertain when the station will open.

== Schools ==
Kenmont Primary School

The educational charity Ark, founded by venture capitalist Arpad Busson, runs three state primary schools in the area, including Ark Franklin in Harvist Road, which replaced Kensal Rise primary in September 2013. In 2024 Ark Franklin received a letter from the Minister of Education congratulating the school for being in the top 2% for early years performance. As of 2020, the following state primary schools are judged to be “good”: Ark Franklin; Princess Frederica CofE in College Road; and Kenmont Primary School in Valliere Road which was built in 1883–84 to a design by the architect by Edward Robert Robson for the School Board for London and has been Grade II listed since 1984.

Three state comprehensive schools are judged to be “good”, including Queens Park Community School in Aylestone Avenue, and Capital City Academy in Doyle Gardens.

There is a small choice of local private schools. The primary schools are Seacole (co-ed, ages four to 11) in Bosworth Road and The Lloyd Williamson School (co-ed, six weeks to 11) in Telford Road. Bales College is a very small independent co-ed secondary school and sixth form college, catering for ages 11 to 20 on Harrow Road. Many parents use the private schools in nearby Belsize Park and Hampstead.

== Kensal Green Cemetery ==
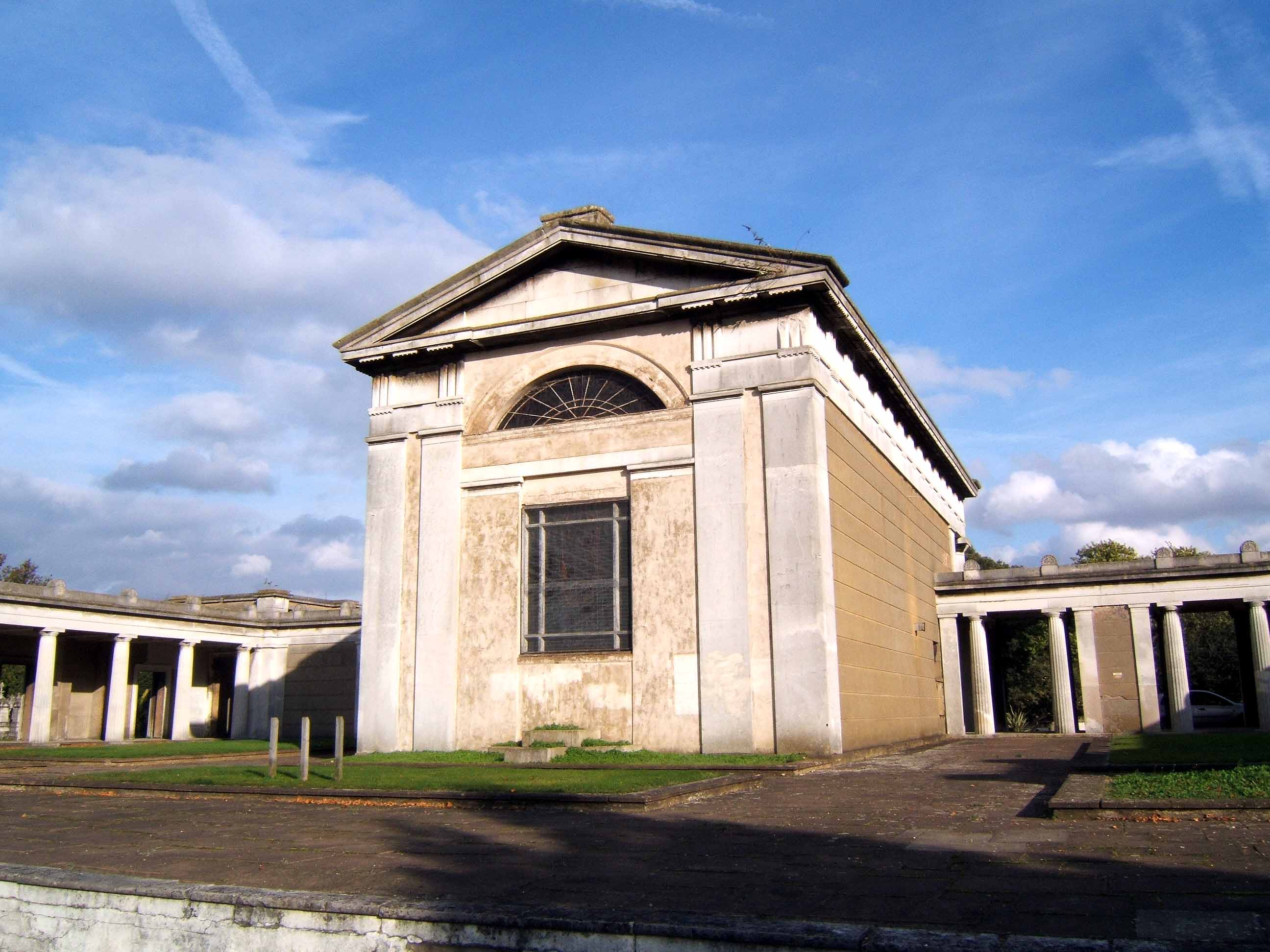
The Catacombs of Kensal Green Cemetery

Kensal Green Cemetery is the first of the 'Magnificent Seven' cemeteries in London. It is the resting place of members of the royal family, including Prince George, Duke of Cambridge, and scores of figures in history including Isambard Kingdom Brunel, Charles Babbage, and William Cavendish-Scott-Bentinck, 5th Duke of Portland. Architects buried there include, Decimus Burton, Philip Charles Hardwick, and John Shaw Jr. From the Arts are playwright, Harold Pinter, actor Mario Fabrizi, William Makepeace Thackery, and Anthony Trollope. The family plot of engineers Marc Brunel and Isambard Kingdom Brunel is also here. Queen frontman Freddie Mercury, actor Alan Rickman, and actress Ingrid Bergman were cremated in the West London Crematorium, which is located within the grounds of the cemetery.

Cemetery directors and The Friends of Kensal Green Cemetery (a charity) lobbied the Heritage Lottery Fund and English Heritage for funding to help preserve historical monuments at the site. The 2015 project, which involved repairs to the grade one listed Anglican Chapel and the boundary wall, was estimated to have cost more than £10m.

The cemetery is listed Grade I on the Register of Historic Parks and Gardens. Many buildings and memorials are recorded in the National Heritage List for England as listed buildings.

== History ==
Originally part of one of the 8 manors within the district of Willesden, Kensal Green is first mentioned in 1253, translating from old English meaning the King's Holt (King's Wood). Its location marked the boundary between Willesden and the then Chelsea & Paddington, on which it remains today. It formed part of one of 10 manors, most likely Chamberlayne Wood Manor, named after Canon Richard de Camera (of the Chambers). In the 15th century the then Archbishop of Canterbury Henry Chichele (1414–1443), acquired lands in Willesden and Kingsbury. In 1443 he founded All Souls' College, Oxford and endowed it with the same lands in his will. As a result, most of Willesden and Kensal Green remained largely agricultural until the mid-1800s, well into the Victorian era. In 1805, the construction of the Grand Junction Canal passed through the district to join the Regent's Canal at Paddington. As the combined Grand Union Canal, this allowed passage of commercial freight traffic from the Midlands to London Docks, and hence onwards to the River Thames. There were two dairy farms in Kensal Green by the early 1800s, which expanded greatly after the 1864 Act of Parliament which made it illegal to keep cattle within the City of London. Although by the late 1800s residential development had greatly reduced the farmland, still in the 1890s many sheep and pigs were raised in the district. One of the farms later became a United Dairies creamery, supplied by milk trains from Mitre Bridge Junction.

St. John's Church was built on the corner of what is now Harrow Road and Kilburn Lane in 1844 and was extensively refurbished in 2017 and fitted with new bells in anticipation of the 175th anniversary in 2019. The church was followed by a school, now Bales College, and more inns including The Plough on the opposite corner of the junction. In 1832 Kensal Green Cemetery was incorporated by Act of Parliament and opened in January 1833. This led to a revaluation of the surrounding lands, and in 1835 ecclesiastical commissioners were appointed by the Crown, who reported in 1846 that: "the larger portion of the Prebendal Estates possess, in our opinion, a value far beyond their present agricultural value."

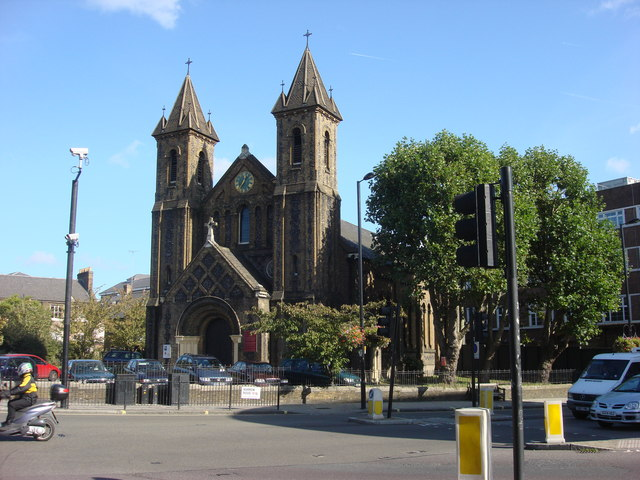
St. John the Evangelist

With enough people living locally to create a new parish, in 1844 St. John the Evangelist Church in Kilburn Lane was consecrated. The 1851 census records just over 800 people living in the new parish. In the 1860s, Kensal Green manor house, situated where Wakeman Road joins Harrow Road, was demolished. Rapid increase in residential development followed, firstly with land west of Kilburn High Road, followed by the sale of Banister's Farm leading to the development of Bannister Road and Mortimer Road. Unfortunately at this time Kensal Green was suffering huge social problems and had a reputation of being a slum, with 55% off its residents living in poverty and squalor, despite being neighbours to thriving Queen's Park.The rapid residential development led to local commissioners reporting in 1880 that there was inadequate drainage and sewerage facilities, with most houses having only improved access to what were the old agricultural drains. In that same year, All Souls' College started to develop its lands north-west of Kilburn Lane, including All Souls' Avenue and College Road, with adjacent roads being named after leading Fellows of the college, and the installation of new sewerage facilities across the district. The college donated lands on which to build Kensal Rise Reading Room, to commemorate the Diamond Jubilee of Queen Victoria, in 1897. Opened by American author Mark Twain in 1901, it was later extended and renamed Kensal Rise Library.

The developments of the streets around Kensal Rise railway station date from the last 10 years of the 19th century and the first decade of the 20th. Although opened in April 1873 as Kensal Green at Chamberlayne Wood, then a remote dead end road; it was renamed Kensal Rise on 24 May 1890. Just north of the station the National Athletic Ground (one of the many early grounds of Queen's Park Rangers) opened in 1890. The ground which was later renamed the Kensal Rise Athletic Stadium also hosted cycling and athletics competitions before being turned over to housing in the 1920s. For a brief period before 1914 the Aeroplane Building and Flying Society had its headquarters at Kensal Rise and flew test gliders from the site. Kensal Green also boasted the Electric Pavilion Cinema which opened in November 1914 and was located on the corner of Chamberlayne Road and Bannister Road.

The construction of the Great Western Railway started in 1835, with the first 22.5 miles (36.2 km) of line, from Paddington station to Maidenhead Bridge station, opened on 4 June 1838. In 1901, its major carriage washing and servicing facilities and locomotive depot were developed at Old Oak Common, bringing further employment and more immigrants to the district. The first major immigrant population had been Irish people fleeing the Great Irish Famine, and then post-World War I. In World War II, due to the railway facilities, the district suffered greatly from German Luftwaffe bombing.

After the war, the area added an Afro-Caribbean part to the population. In the 1960s the college disposed of many freeholds, while retaining land in Willesden. Since the 1980s, the Irish-born community has reduced in size, although the legacy of their presence remains, not least in the number of Irish pubs and organisations and the many thousands with Irish ancestry who continue to populate the area. According to statistics from the 2001 census, the area has a very high proportion of young residents (28.4% 25–44 years old) and a very high educational level (30.7% hold a first degree or better).

As of June 2014 the area had seen significant gentrification as people had been priced out of surrounding areas such as Notting Hill. In 2015 it was described as 'celebrity haunt-meets-Nappy Valley'.

== Demographics ==
The largest ethnic group in Kensal Green ward according to the 2011 census was White British, 26%. The second largest was White other, 18%, followed by Black Caribbean, 12%. Neighbouring Queen's Park ward, which also covers eastern areas of Kensal Green, was 30% White British. The College Park ward, which covers the southern areas of Kensal Green, was 31.6% white British, 18.4% White other and 21.1% Black. Kensal Green ward has the highest Latin American population in London.

== Politics and government ==
Kensal Green is part of the Queen's Park and Maida Vale constituency for elections to the House of Commons, represented by Georgia Gould from the Labour Party since 2024.

Kensal Green is part of the Harlesden and Kensal Green ward for elections to Brent London Borough Council.

== Tornado on 7 December 2006 ==
On 7 December 2006 at 11.00 am, a tornado struck Kensal Green. Up to 150 houses were damaged, and six people were injured, one requiring hospital attention. Residential roads were closed off and residents had to seek temporary accommodation. Traffic was also diverted, causing disruption. The cost of the damage was estimated to be at least £2 million.

== See also ==
- Crossrail
- Old Oak Common
- Dissenters' Chapel, Kensal Green
- Kensal Rise Library
- Kensal Town

Nearest places:

- Queen's Park
- Ladbroke Grove
- Kilburn
- Brondesbury
- Old Oak Common
- Paddington

Nearest stations:

- Kensal Green station
- Kensal Rise railway station
- Willesden Junction station
