= College Park and Old Oak =

Electoral ward in London, England

- Electoral ward for the Hammersmith and Fulham London Borough Council
- Borough: Hammersmith and Fulham
- County: Greater London
- Population: 9,984 (2021)
- Area: 3.442 km²

Current electoral ward
- Created: 1965
- Councillors: 3; 2 (2002-2022)

College Park and Old Oak is an electoral ward in the London Borough of Hammersmith and Fulham. The ward was first used in the 1964 elections and elects three councillors to Hammersmith and Fulham London Borough Council.

== Geography ==
The ward is named after the areas of College Park and Old Oak Common.

== Councillors ==
Election	Councillors		
2022	Wesley Harcourt (Labour)	Bora Kwon (Labour)	Alex Sanderson (Labour)

== Elections ==
=== 2022 ===
College Park & Old Oak (3)
Party	Candidate	Votes	%	±%
Labour	Wesley Harcourt	1,284	77.3	
Labour	Alexandra Sanderson	1,237	74.5	
Labour	Bora Kwon	1,194	71.9	
Conservative	Jack Smith	248	14.9	
Conservative	Kieran Bergholcs	247	14.9	
Conservative	Alexander Nicholson	247	14.9	
Liberal Democrats	Molly McLoughlin	235	14.1	
Turnout		1,661	27.2	
Labour hold				
Labour hold				
Labour win (new seat)				

== See also ==
- List of electoral wards in Greater London
