= Kenmont Primary School =

Location
- Valliere Road, Kensal Green; London, NW10 6AL; England
- Coordinates: 51°31′54″N 0°14′05″W

Information
- Other name: KPS
- Type: Community primary school
- Local authority: Hammersmith and Fulham London Borough Council
- Department for Education URN: 100331 Tables
- Ofsted: Reports
- Head teacher: David Collins
- Gender: Mixed
- Age range: 3–11
- Enrolment: 211 (2018)
- Capacity: 240
- Website: www.kenmont.lbhf.sch.uk

Kenmont Primary School (KPS) is a 3–11 mixed community primary school in Kensal Green, London, England. It was designed in 1883–84 by the architect Edward Robert Robson for the School Board for London and completed after 1894. It has been Grade II listed since 1984 and has been described as a "particularly impressive and well-preserved example of a Robson board school, remarkable for its unusual plan and dramatic, fortress-like composition".
