= West London =

Western part of London, England

West London is the western part of London, England, north of the River Thames, west of the City of London, and extending to the Greater London boundary.

The term is used to differentiate the area from the other parts of London: Central London, North London, East London and South London. West London was part of the historic county of Middlesex.

== Emergence ==
Early West London had two main focuses of growth, the area around Thorney Island, site of Westminster Abbey and the Palace of Westminster, and ribbon development heading west - towards Westminster - from gates in the walls of the City of London. In the 17th century these areas of growth would be linked by high status new developments, which formed a focal point in their own right, later becoming known as the West End of London.

=== Initial growth ===
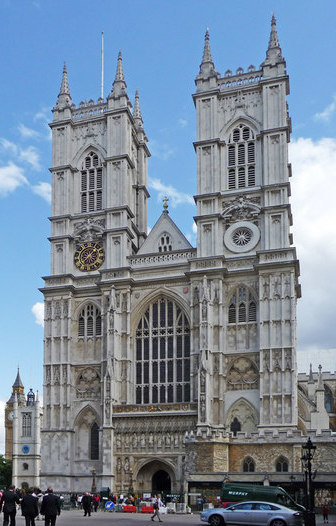
The consecration of Westminster Abbey stimulated population growth west of the City of London.

The development of the area began with the establishment of the Abbey on a site then called Thorney Island, the choice of site may in part relate to the natural ford which is thought to have carried Watling Street over the River Thames in the vicinity. Tradition dates the foundation to the 7th century AD with written records dating back to the 960s or early 970s. The Island and surrounding area became known as Westminster in reference to the church.

The legendary origin is that in the early 7th century, a local fisherman named Edric ferried a stranger in tattered foreign clothing over the River Thames to Thorney Island. It was a miraculous appearance of St Peter, a fisherman himself, coming to the island to consecrate the newly built church, which would subsequently develop into Westminster Abbey. He rewarded Edric with a bountiful catch when he next dropped his nets. Edric was instructed to present the King and St. Mellitus, Bishop of London with a salmon and various proofs that the consecration had already occurred. Every year on 29 June, St Peters day, the Worshipful Company of Fishmongers presents the Abbey with a salmon in memory of this event.

The Palace of Westminster subsequently developed, with Parliament being based there from its establishment in 1265. The presence of the centre of government as a distinct focus for growth, accompanied by the proximity of the city, ensured that western London was the fastest growing part of early London.

=== First West End ===
The growth of the City of London beyond its city walls was much faster outside the western gates of Ludgate and Newgate than it was outside the gates to the north or to the east; this rapid growth was due to the roads from these western gates leading to the political centre of Westminster. The large and prosperous extramural ward of Farringdon Without, extensively urbanised during the 12th century, has been described as London's First West End.

From the 15th to 17th centuries, growth along the roads from Ludgate (Fleet Street and The Strand) and Newgate (Holborn and High Holborn) accelerated, and came to extend far beyond Farringdon Without, into Holborn, Bloomsbury and Westminster.

=== New West End ===
Urban growth extending from the Westminster urban area, linked up with that extending from the City in the time of Henry VIII. It was at around that time that Westminster first acquired City status.

In the mid 17th century Henry Jermyn, was instrumental in developing the St James's and Mayfair districts of Westminster. These districts provided a fashionable new focus for western London, that came to be known as the West End. Jermyn would become known as the Father of the West End.

In 1720, John Strype's "Survey of London" described Westminster as one of the then four distinct areas of London; in it he describes the City of London, Westminster (West London), Southwark (South London), and 'That Part beyond the Tower' (East London). The area now usually referred to as North London developed later.

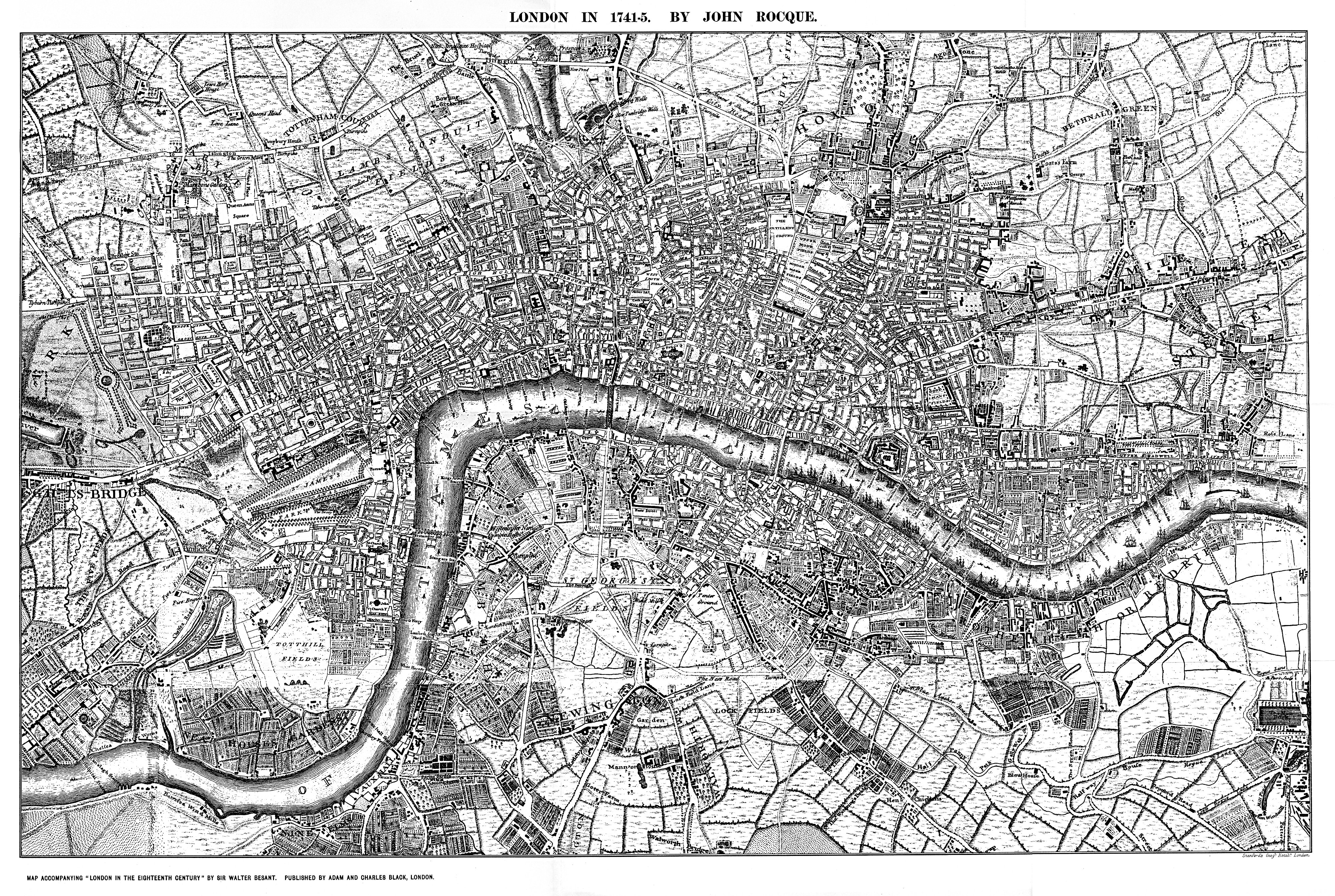
A detailed copy of John Rocque's Map of London, 1741-5

As well as the proximity of the centre of government, the West End was long favoured by the rich elite as a place of residence because it was usually upwind of the smoke drifting from the crowded City. A further factor facilitating rapid growth in West London was the very large number of bridges linking the area to South London and the area beyond; by contrast, even today, there are no bridges east of Tower Bridge, partly as the river becomes wider as it heads east.

The term "West End of London" gained widespread currency as a proper noun, rather than just a geographical description in the 19th century.

=== Rapid growth ===
Like other areas of the capital, West London grew rapidly in the Victorian era as a result of railway-based commuting; with the building of the termini at Paddington and Marylebone, and the lines radiating from them, having a particularly profound effect. This trend continued in the twentieth century and was subsequently reinforced by motorcar-based commuting.

The size of London stabilised after the establishment of the Metropolitan Green Belt shortly after the Second World War.

== Geography ==
=== Topography ===
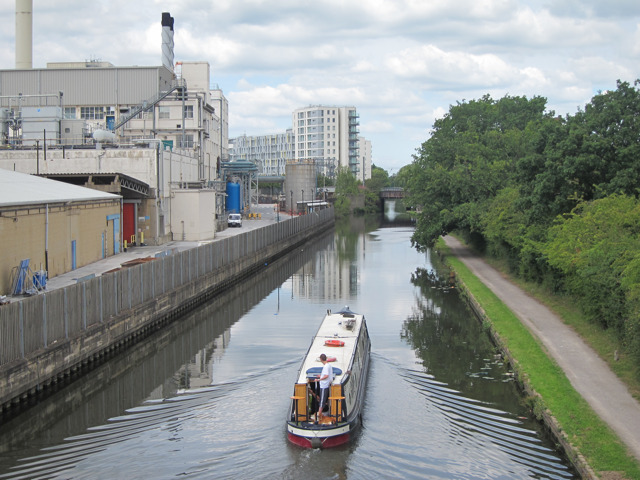
The Grand Union Canal in Hayes, Hillingdon

West London is an informally and inexactly defined area lying north of the River Thames and extending west from the edge of the City of London, to West London's historic and commercial core of Westminster and the West End (areas also regarded as part of Central London) and on to the Greater London boundary, much of which is formed by the River Colne. Some interpretations of the area include the boroughs of Brent and Harrow, taking ancient Watling Street as the boundary in those outer areas. The Grand Union Canal is West London's major internal waterway.

West London is bordered by the administrative counties of Surrey to the south west and south; Berkshire to the west and north west; Buckinghamshire to the north west; and Hertfordshire to the north.

A publication by the Mayor of London in 2011 referred to the London boroughs of Brent, Harrow, Ealing, Hammersmith and Fulham, Hounslow, Richmond, and Hillingdon as West London. The London Borough of Richmond upon Thames spans the River Thames so its status can be ambiguous.

The term West London is used to differentiate the area from other informal radial divisions of London, the Metropolitan Compass; North London, East London and South London.

=== Official designations ===
Sub-regions used in the London Plan. The West sub-region covers parts of West London.

The term "West London" has been used for a variety of formal purposes with the boundaries defined according to the purposes of the designation.

==== Planning Policy sub-region ====
The 2011 iteration of the London Plan included an altered "West" sub-region, to be used for planning, engagement, resource allocation and progress reporting purposes. It consists of the London Boroughs of Brent, Harrow, Ealing, Hammersmith and Fulham, Hillingdon, Hounslow and Richmond upon Thames. As well as including outer areas of West London, the sub-region also includes areas south of the river, not usually counted as part of West London; areas of the cross-river London Borough of Richmond upon Thames.

The 2004-2008 and 2008-2011 versions of the sub-region varied in their composition.

==== W postcode area ====
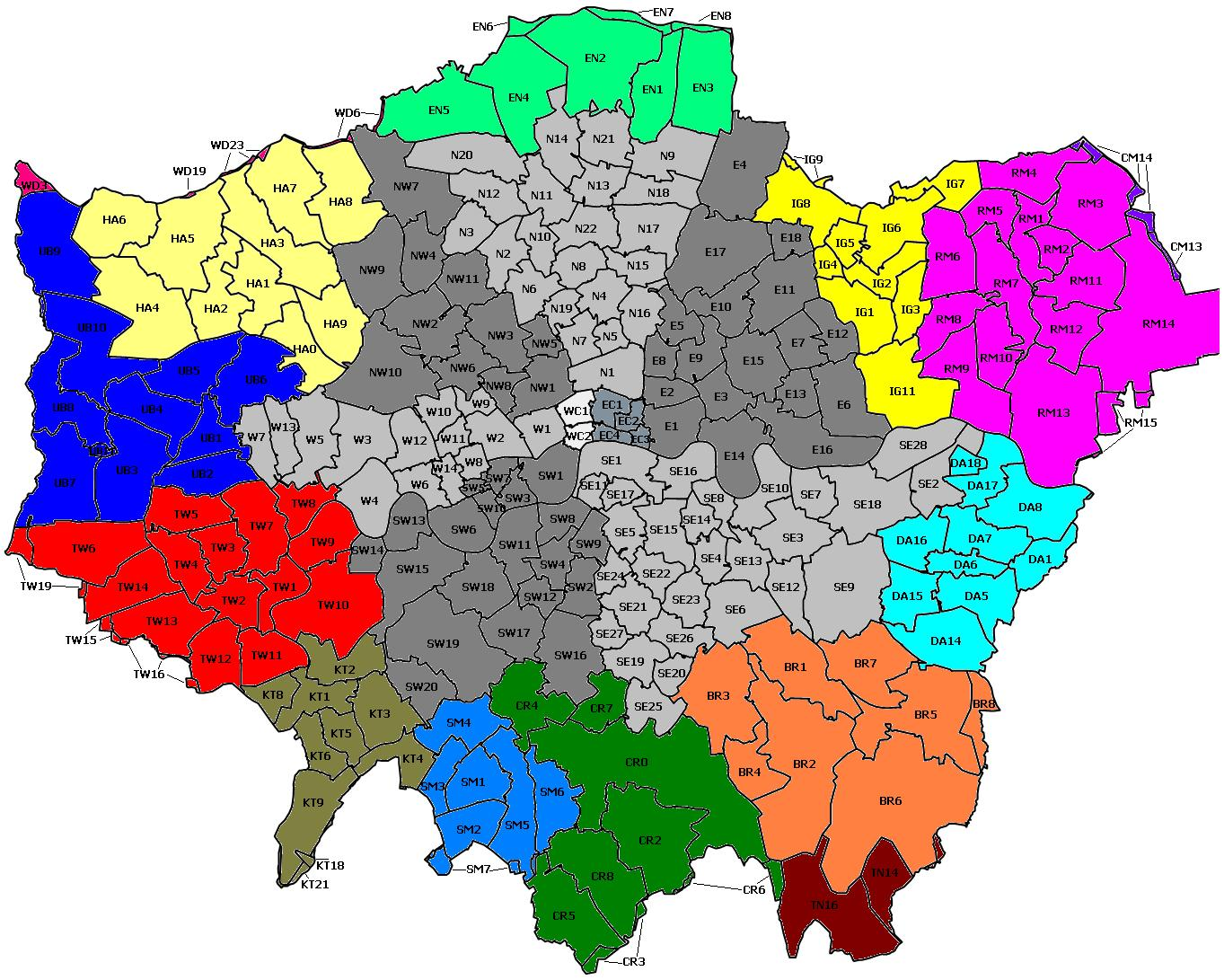
Map of postcodes in Greater London. The "Western" district is a sub-set of West London.

The W (Western) postcode area was introduced in 1857 to facilitate the distribution of mail. The postcode area is a sub-set of West London.

== Economy ==
=== London Plan ===
The London Plan defines two areas of London as International Centres, the West End and Knightsbridge, both in west London. Five of the thirteen Metropolitan Centres in the plan are also in West London: Ealing, Hounslow, Harrow, Uxbridge and Shepherd's Bush.

Eleven of the London Plan's thirty-eight Opportunity Areas are part of West London; Kensal Canalside, Paddington, Earl's Court and West Kensington, Harrow and Wealdstone, Park Royal, Old Oak Common, Southall, Tottenham Court Road, Victoria, Wembley and White City.

=== Major employers ===
London Heathrow Airport is a major employer in West London, and the University of West London has more than 47,000 students.
