= Kensal Rise Library =

- 51.5339°N 0.2261°W,
- Location: Bathurst Gardens, London NW10 5EU, United Kingdom
- Type: Public Library
- Established: 1904
- Branches: 1

Collection
- Items collected: Books, Audiobooks, Ebooks, CDs, DVDs.

Access and use
- Access requirements: Free to all, but library borrowing requires library card registration

Other information
- Employees: 1
- Website: https://kensalriselibrary.org/

Kensal Rise Library is a public library in London, England, opened by American author Mark Twain in 1900. The site was donated by All Souls College, Oxford. The library's threatened closure prompted a large campaign to save it, led by figures including Alan Bennett, Philip Pullman, Zadie Smith, Nick Cave and Pet Shop Boys.

The library was formerly part of the London Borough of Brent library services, it is now run independently. Users require a specific Kensal Rise Library card to use the service and it is open 2 days a week.

== History ==
Kensal Rise Library designed by Done, Hunter and co. architects and was opened by Mark Twain, who had been staying nearby at Dollis Hill House, whose guests have included Prime Minister William Ewart Gladstone and which was later used by Winston Churchill's War Cabinet. At the ceremony, Mark Twain gave the Library Committee chairman five of his books and a signed photograph. A plaque was also installed noting Mark Twain's visit and donation of £3000 from Andrew Carnegie.

In 1922 the library became the first in the then borough of Willesden to have books on open access shelves.

In autumn 1964 the Children's Library was moved into the 1928 extension. Murals created in 1934 were still in the building, stored on one of the upper floors, in the late 2000s.

In 1994, the interior was refurbished in a Neo-Edwardian style.

Brent Council put forward proposals to close the library in November 2010. The proposals were met with widespread condemnation and significant media coverage, and protests at council meetings. Philip Pullman described the proposed closure as "barbarism". The campaign to save the library was supported by Alan Bennett, Zadie Smith, Nick Cave and the Pet Shop Boys.

In May 2012, the council removed books and the Mark Twain plaque in the middle of the night, due to 'public safety concerns' around the closure of the service.

All Souls College sold the building in April 2015, to Uplift Properties Ltd, stipulating to the buyer that Friends of Kensal Rise Library have a rent free space for a community library on the ground floor of the library building. An open day was held inside the library building on 6 June 2015, and after an estimated £200,00 of refurbishment costs, the new library opened in 2016.

After the closure of the library, volunteers from the local community set up a pop-up library outside.

By late 2018, Friends of Kensal Rise Library had signed a long lease for part of the ground floor, following refurbishment. The library part of the building has been open for various community and fundraising events in 2018 and 2019. Book shelving was put in place and the library open for book donations from 7 to 13 April 2019.

The library now is open to the public only two days a week as an independent library, separate from the London Borough of Brent library service, run by the Friends of the library as a registered charity. They employ a Library Manager, but otherwise rely on volunteers and book donations.

== In popular culture ==
The library features in:

- Alan Bennett's Keeping On Keeping On (2016)
- Ali Smith's Public Library and Other Stories (2015)
- Iain Sinclair's London Overground: A Day's Walk Around the Ginger Line (2015)
- Iain Sinclair's The Last London (2017)
- Lilian Pizzichini's Dead Men's Wages (2011)
- Zadie Smith's Feel Free: Essays (2018)
- Zadie Smith's NW (2012)
