= Old Oak and Park Royal Development Corporation =

Development corporation in London, England

- Abbreviation: OPDC
- Formation: 1 April 2015
- Type: Mayoral development corporation
- Headquarters: City Hall, London
- Location: Old Oak Common
- Chair: Boris Johnson (2015–2016); Liz Peace (2017–2024); Dame Karen Buck (2024–present)
- Chief executive: Victoria Hills (2015–2018); David Lunts (2019–2025); Matthew Carpen (2025–present)
- Parent organisation: Greater London Authority
- Website: www.london.gov.uk/who-we-are/city-halls-partners/old-oak-and-park-royal-development-corporation-opdc

The Old Oak and Park Royal Development Corporation (OPDC) is a mayoral development corporation established in April 2015 by the Mayor of London.

== Organisation ==
OPDC was established by the Mayor of London; approval was granted by the Secretary of State for Communities and Local Government, Eric Pickles in January 2015.

The corporation is responsible for regenerating 650 hectares including the common land area of Old Oak Common and the industrial Park Royal site in West London. Plans are in place for the construction of 24,000 homes in Old Oak, consisting of a mixture of house types and tenures, along with opportunities for a minimum of 1,500 new homes to be built in non-industrial areas in Park Royal. In addition to this, the creation of 65,000 new jobs will stem from the development of the Old Oak Common station and the attraction of new businesses to Park Royal, joined by those who relocate from Old Oak.

Old Oak Common is a large area of common land situated in the London boroughs of Hammersmith and Fulham, Brent and Ealing. The corporation assumes various statutory powers related to planning, infrastructure, regeneration and land acquisitions.
