= Old Oak Common =

Coordinates: 51.5244°N 0.2421°W

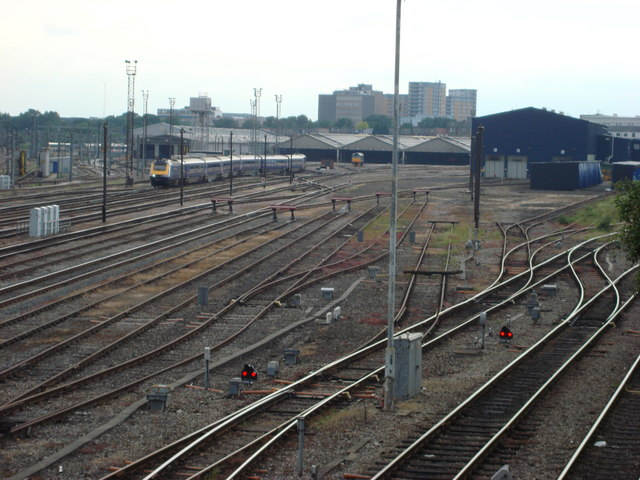
- Old Oak Common Railway Maintenance Depot

- Location within Greater London
- Population: 9,175
- OS grid reference: TQ216823
- London borough: Hammersmith & Fulham
- Ceremonial county: Greater London
- Region: London
- Country: England
- Sovereign state: United Kingdom
- Post town: LONDON
- Postcode district: NW10
- Dialling code: 020
- Police: Metropolitan
- Fire: London
- Ambulance: London
- UK Parliament: Ealing Central and Acton
- London Assembly: West Central

Old Oak Common is a semi-industrial area of London, between Harlesden and Acton. The area is traditionally known for its railway depots, particularly Old Oak Common TMD which was decommissioned in 2021. Together with neighbouring Park Royal, the area is intended to become the UK's largest regeneration scheme.

Old Oak Common has been in the London Borough of Hammersmith and Fulham since 1994. Further south lies an open area, Wormwood Scrubs Park, and Wormwood Scrubs prison. To the north it is bounded by the Grand Union Canal and across it lies Willesden Junction station.

== History ==
Originally, Old Oak Common was a stretch of land defined by what became the Harrow Road at its northern end, and the northern source of Stamford Brook at its eastern edge, forming a boundary with Wormwood Scrubs. By 1801, the Paddington Canal had cut it in half, further reducing its size.

The Great Western Railway's Great Western Main Line (GWML) of 1838–1841 from London Paddington to Bristol and the 1903 Acton-Northolt line to the Great Western and Great Central Joint Railway at Northolt divided at Old Oak junction.

Before 1965, Old Oak Common formed part of the Municipal Borough of Acton, and the area thus became part of the London Borough of Ealing that year. Following a revision of municipal boundaries in 1994, Old Oak Common was transferred from Ealing to Hammersmith and Fulham.

The partially singled Acton-Northolt line closed in December 2018 to allow for the construction of Old Oak Common railway station, which will offer interchange between GWML trains, the Elizabeth line and the High Speed 2 (HS2) line heading north. Additional rail interchanges may be provided with the construction of two new London Overground stations, Hythe Road on the West London line and Old Oak Common Lane on the North London line.

In summer 2011, the London Borough of Hammersmith and Fulham launched a wide-ranging 'Park Royal City' plan for Old Oak Common, including the proposed station, and with light-rail lines to the surrounding areas.

== Regeneration ==
In December 2013, The Independent reported that Antony Spencer, founder of Stadium Capital Development, was to head up a £5 billion regeneration scheme in the area, with partner Queens Park Rangers. The proposal included new homes, office, retail outlets, and a proposed football stadium for QPR. The planning application was rejected.

The Old Oak and Park Royal Development Corporation was established in 2015 to lead regeneration and planning work for an area covering Old Oak Common and much of the Park Royal area. The combined redevelopment area is envisaged to provide 65,000 new jobs and 25,000 new homes. The scale of the developments have led to Park Royal and Old Oak Common being described as a potential "Canary Wharf of West London".

The engineering plans were revealed in 2018 showing a station at Old Oak Common for HS2, the high speed line running from London to Birmingham. Passengers using HS2 will be able to disembark at Old Oak Common and interchange with the Elizabeth line, Chiltern Railways and Great Western Railway services. The station will have a capacity for around 100 million passengers, rivalling London Waterloo in Central London.

Queens Park Rangers F.C. planned to build a new stadium with 40,000 capacity for its club in the regeneration area, but these plans have been hampered.

== Politics ==
Old Oak Common is part of the College Park and Old Oak ward for elections to Hammersmith and Fulham London Borough Council.
