= List of breakfast cereals =

This is a list of breakfast cereals. Many cereals are trademarked brands of large companies, such as Kellanova, WK Kellogg Co, General Mills, Malt-O-Meal, Nestlé, Quaker Oats and Post Consumer Brands, but similar equivalent products are often sold by other manufacturers and as store brands.

== 0-9 ==
- 100% Natural – Quaker Oats (1972)
  - 100% Natural Granola: Low Fat With Raisins
  - 100% Natural Granola: Oats & Honey
  - 100% Natural Granola: Oats, Honey & Raisins

== A ==
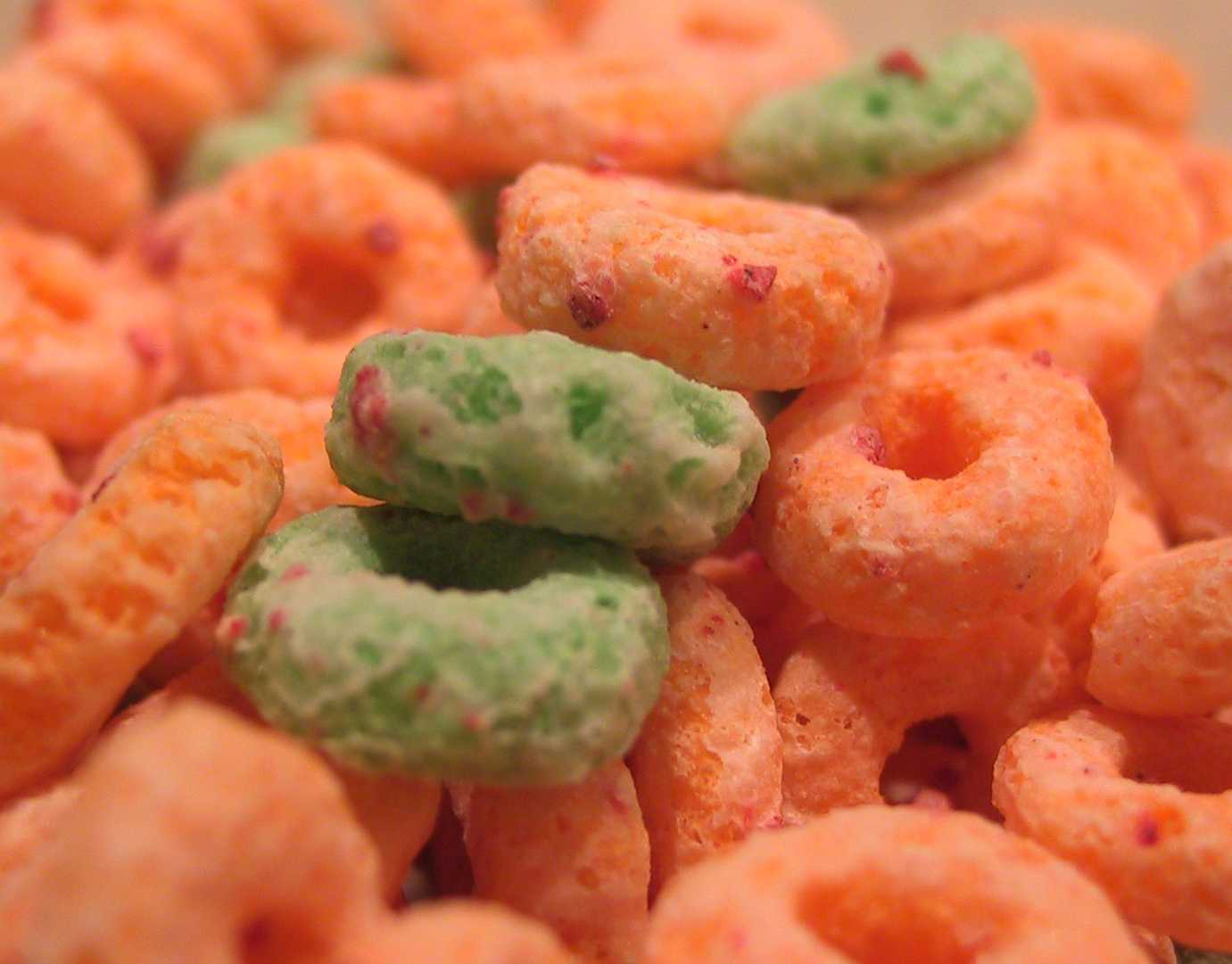
Apple Jacks

- Addams Family – Ralston (1991)
- All-Bran – Kellogg's (1916–present)
- Almond Delight – Ralston
- Alpen – Weetabix Limited
- Alpen No Sugar – Weetabix Limited
- Alpha-Bits – Post Cereals (1958–2021)
- The Amazing Spider-Man Cereal – Kellogg's (2012)
- Apple Cinnamon Oh!s – Quaker Oats (1989)
- Apple Oh!s – Quaker Oats
- Apple Jacks – Kellogg's (1965–present)
- Apple Raisin Crisp – Kellogg's
- Apple Zaps – Quaker Oats
- Apple Zings – Malt-O-Meal Company
- Aquaman – Funko
- Atlantis: The Lost Empire – Kellogg's (2001)
- Avengers – Kellogg's

== B ==
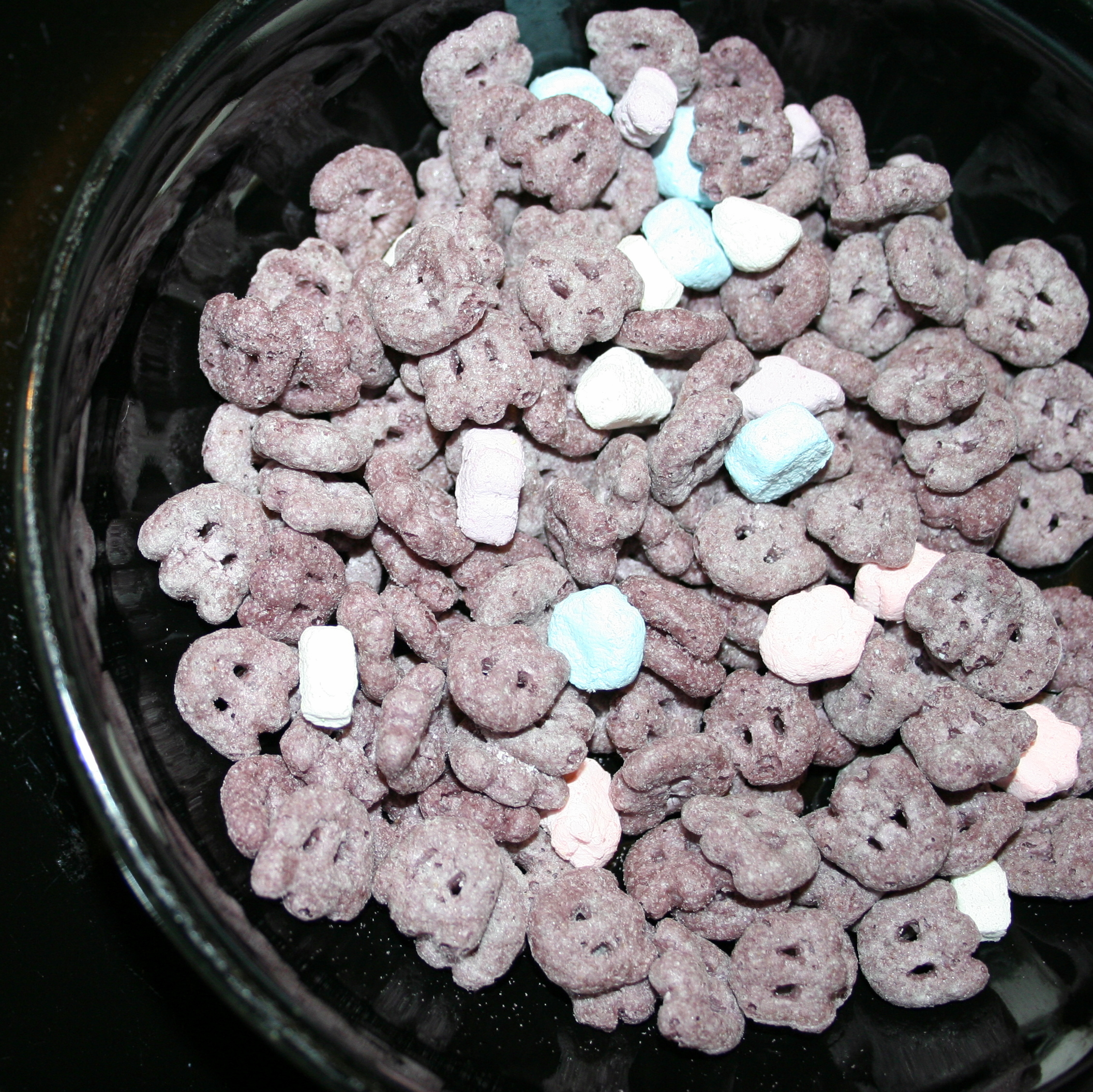
Boo Berry

- Baby Shark Cereal – Kellogg's (2019)
- Banana Nut Crunch - Post, Great Grains
- Banana Wackies – General Mills (1965)
- Barbie Fairytopia – Kellogg's (2005)
- Baron von Redberry
- Bart Simpson's No ProblemO's – Kellogg's (2002)
- Bart Simpson's Eat My Shorts – Kellogg's (2003)
- Bart Simpson Peanut Butter Chocolate Crunch – Kellogg's (2001)
- Basic 4 – General Mills
- Batman – Ralcorp
- Batman – Funko
- Batman – General Mills
- Batman Returns – Ralcorp
- Benefit – General Mills
- Bigg Mixx – Kellogg's (1990)
- Black Panther – FYE
- Blueberry Monster Crunch – Disney Magic (2006)
- Blueberry Muffin Toasters – Malt-O-Meal (2019)
- Bob Ross The Joy of Cereal – FYE (2019–present)
- Body Buddies – General Mills
- Boo Berry – General Mills (1973–present / seasonal since 2010)
- Booty O's – FYE (2016)
- Bran Flakes
  - Crownfield – Lidl
  - Harvest Morn – Aldi
  - Kellogg's (1922–present)
  - Post
- Breakfast with Barbie – Ralston (1989)
- Buc Wheats – General Mills (discontinued)
- Bunuelitos – General Mills
- Buttercups – General Mills (1965)
- Buzz Blasts – Disney/Pixar/Kellogg's (2002–2005)

== C ==
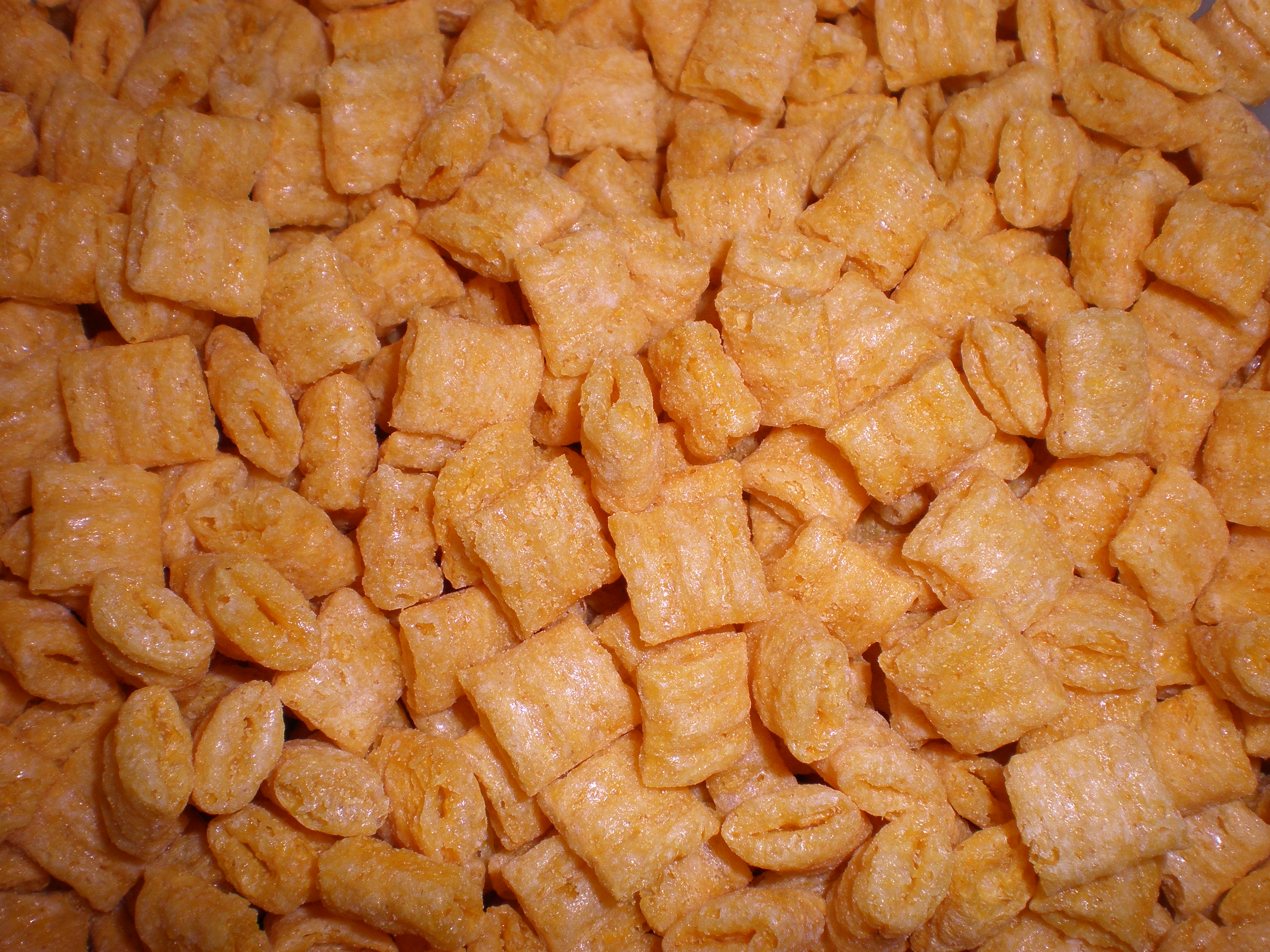
Cap'n Crunch

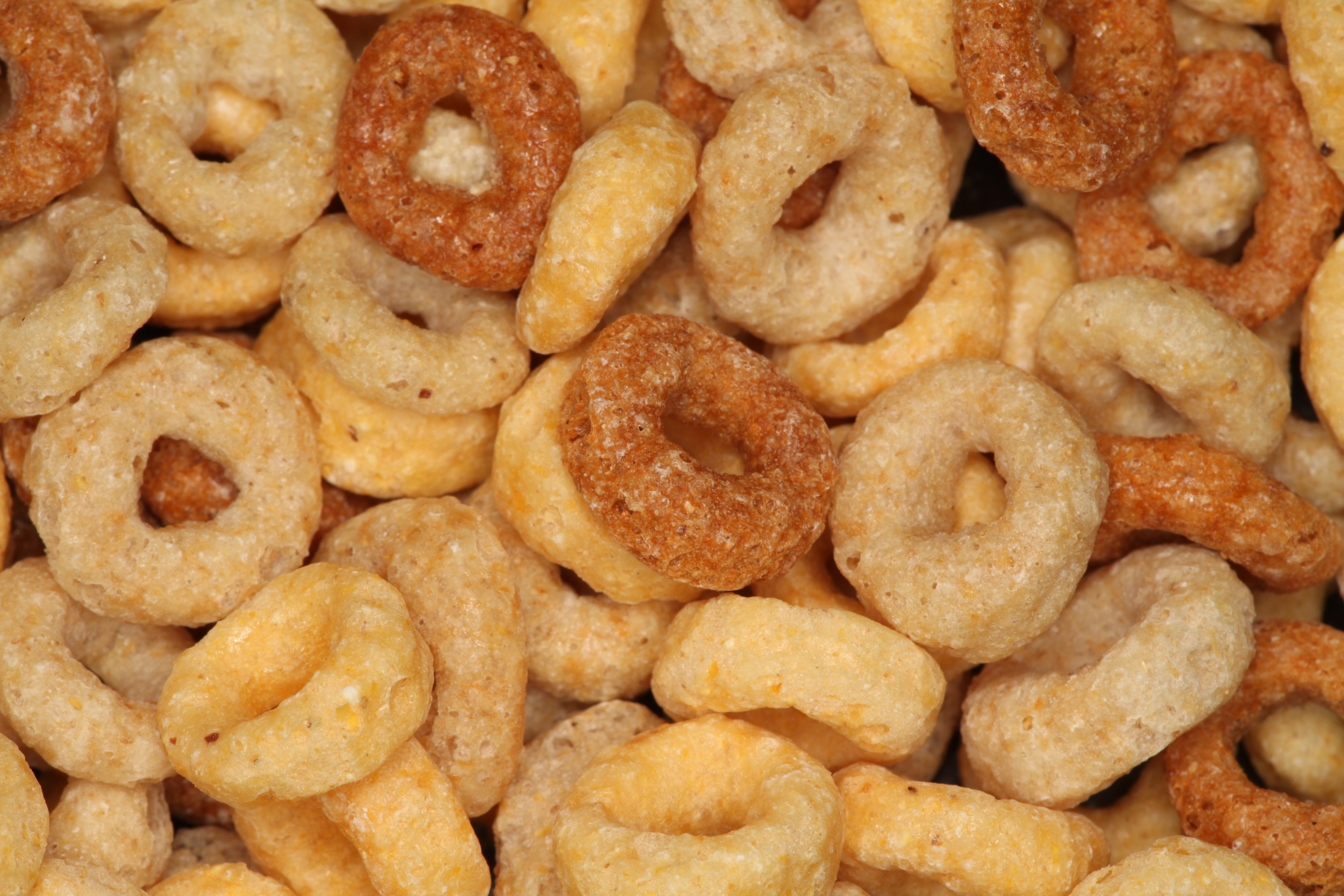
MultiGrain Cheerios

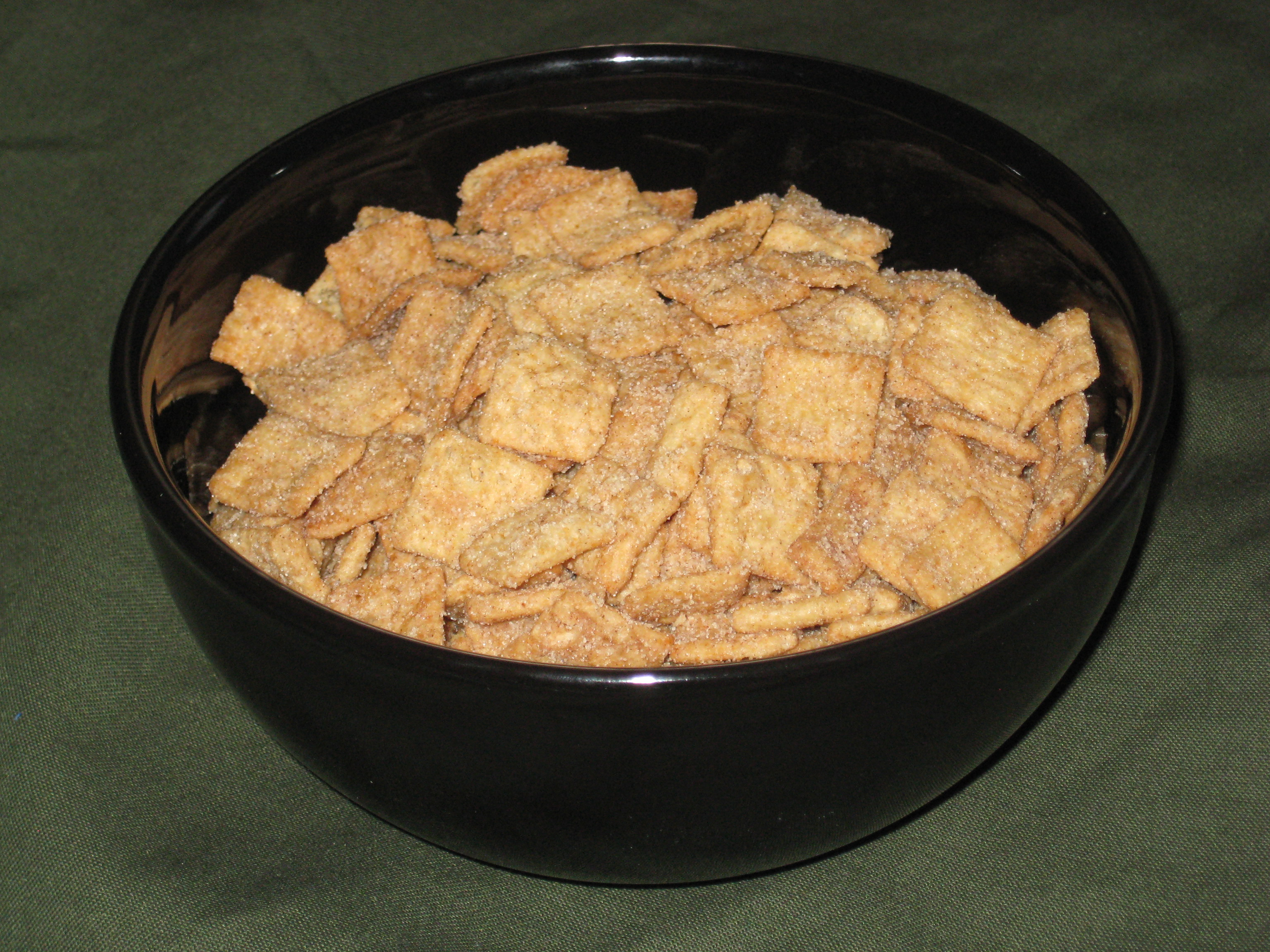
Cinnamon Toast Crunch

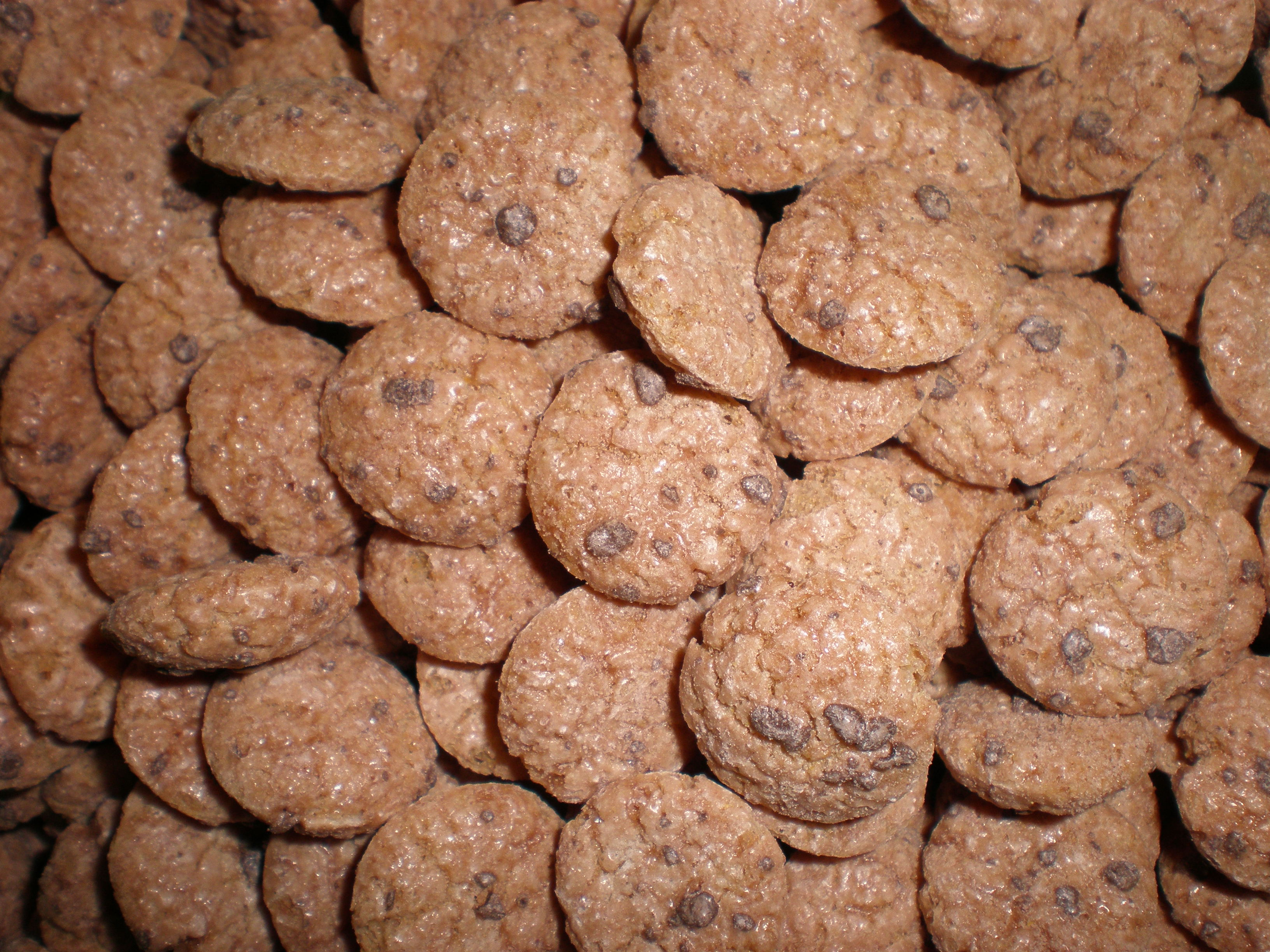
Cookie Crisp

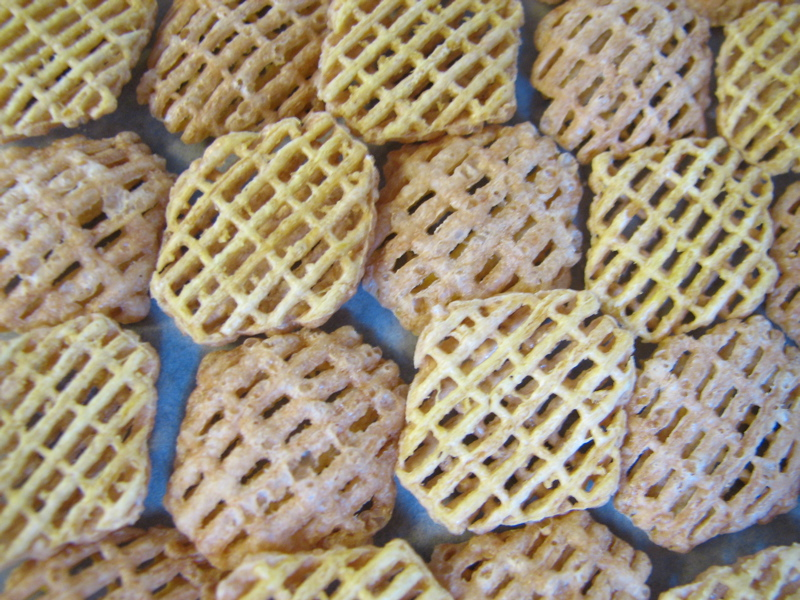
Crispix

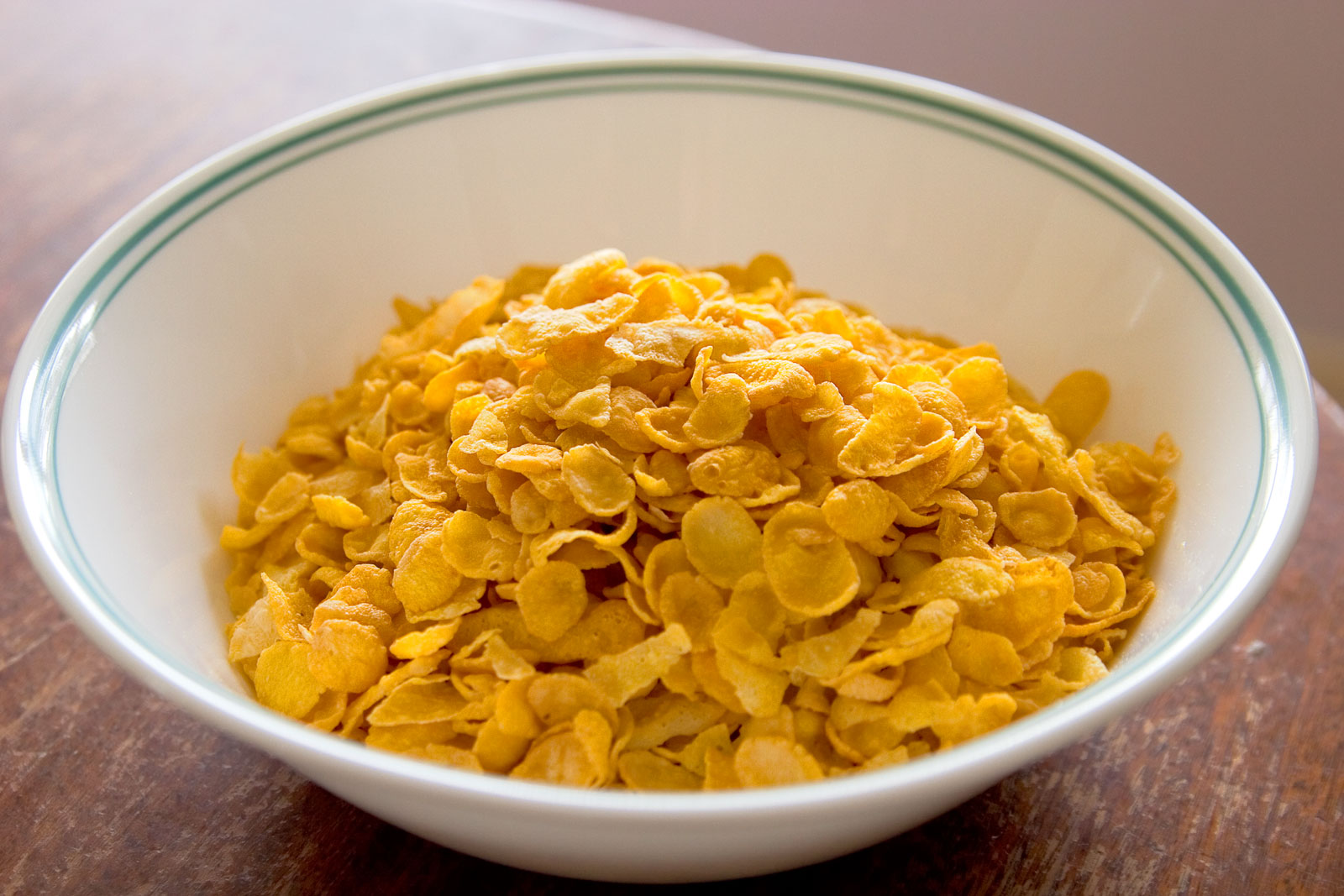
Corn Flakes

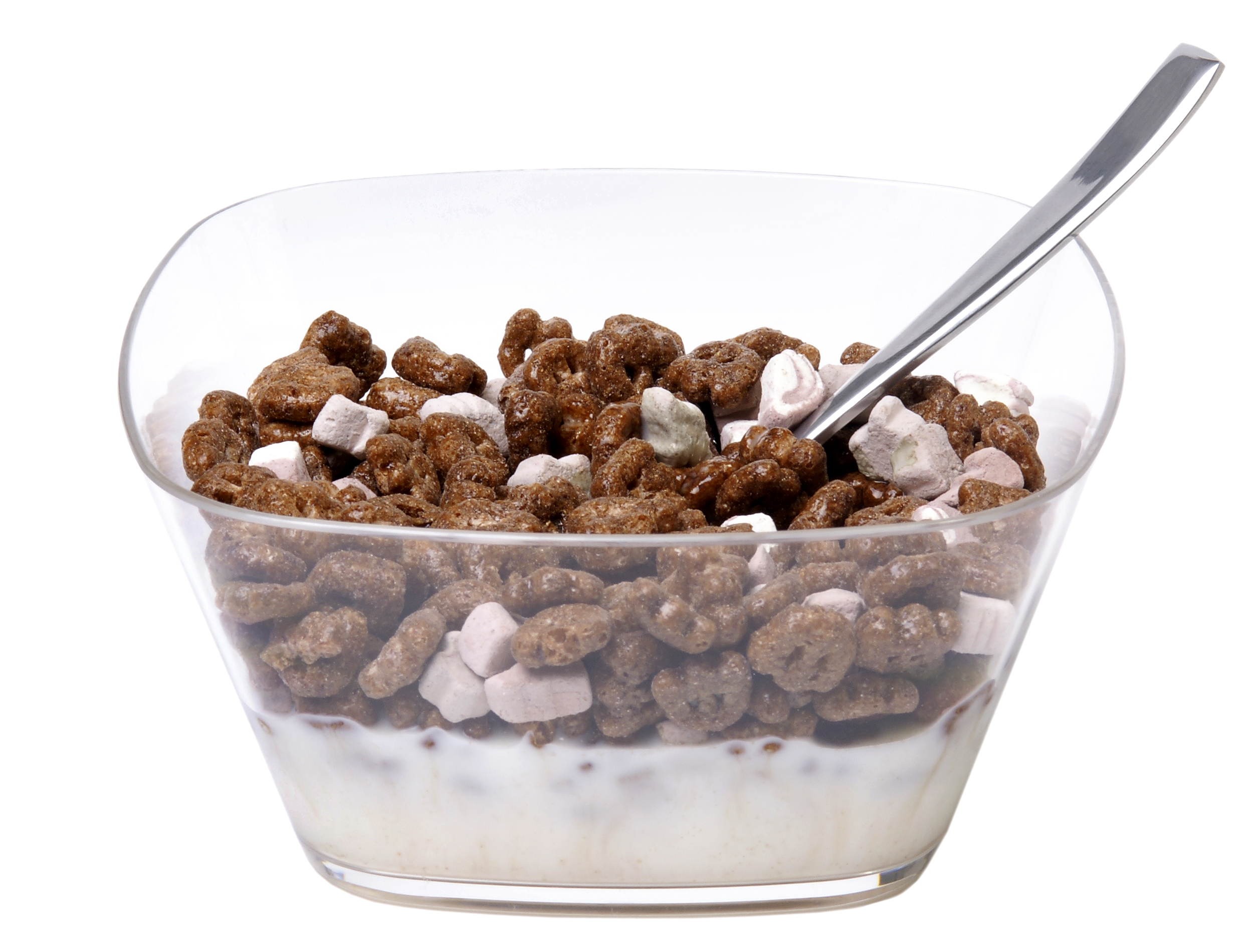
Count Chocula

- C-3PO's – based on the Star Wars character C-3PO (1984)
- Cabbage Patch Kids Cereal (1980s)
- Cap'n Crunch – Quaker Oats (1963–present)
  - Airhead Berries
  - Beach Bash Crunch (2018)
  - Birthday Crunch (2023)
  - Blueberry Pancake Crunch (2017)
  - Cap'n Crunch Crunch Berries – Quaker Oats (1980–present)
  - Caramel Popcorn Crunch (2015)
  - Carnival Berries
  - Choco Crunch
  - Choco Donuts – (2003)
  - Chocolatey Berry Crunch – (2020)
  - Chocolatey Crunch (2011)
  - Chocolatey Peanut Butter Crunch
  - Christmas Crunch (1988-present, seasonal)
  - Cinnamon Crunch – (1973–present)
  - Cinnamon Roll Crunch – (2012)
  - Cotton Candy Crunch (2019)
  - Cozmic Crunch (1999)
  - Crunch Treasures (2010)
  - Deep Sea Crunch (1993)
  - Freedom Crunch (2017)
  - Halloween Crunch (2007–present; seasonally)
  - Hero Crunch (2019)
  - Home Run Crunch – (1995–1996, 2007–2008 (rerelease), 2016 (second rerelease))
  - Peanut Butter Crunch – Quaker Oats (1969–present)
  - Mystery Crunch (2000)
  - Mystery Volcano Crunch (2000)
  - Neutron Berries (2001)
  - Oops! All Berries (1997–present)
  - Orange Cream Pop Crunch (2016)
  - Polar Crunch (2006)
  - Punch Crunch – Quaker Oats (1973)
  - Race Car Crunch (2009)
  - Red, White, And Blue Crunch (2019–present; seasonally)
  - Rugrats Go Wild! Berries (2003)
  - Sea Creature Berries
  - Smashed Berries (2001)
  - Soccer Crunch (2010)
  - Sprinkled Donut Crunch – (2014?)
  - Strawberry Shortcake Crunch (2019)
  - Superman Crunch (2006)
  - Swirled Berries (2005)
  - Touchdown Crunch – (2019)
  - Treasure Hunt Crunch (2008)
  - Triple Crunch (1990)
  - Vanilly Crunch – Quaker Oats (1971)
  - Very Berry Crunch
- Captain Planet Cereal (1994)
- Caramel Crunch – Girl Scouts of the USA (2017)
- Caramel Crunchfuls – (2010)
- Cars – Kellogg's (2006)
- Cars 2 – Kellogg's (2011)
- Cars 3 – Kellogg's (2017)
- The Cat in the Hat – Kellogg's (2003)
- Caticorn – Kellogg's
- Cheerios – General Mills (1941–present)
  - Ancient Grain Cheerios (2015)
  - Apple Cinnamon Cheerios (1988–present)
  - Banana Nut Cheerios (2008)
  - Berry Burst Cheerios (2003)
    - Berry Burst Cheerios – Strawberry (2003)
    - Berry Burst Cheerios – Strawberry Banana (2004)
    - Berry Burst Cheerios – Triple Berry (2003)
  - Blueberry Cheerios (2019)
  - Cheerios Protein – Cheerios (2024)
    - Cheerios Protein Cinnamon Almond
    - Cheerios Protein Oats & Honey
  - Cinnamon Cheerios (2004–present)
  - Cinnamon Burst Cheerios (2011)
  - Cinnamon Nut Cheerios (1980)
  - Chocolate Cheerios (2010–present)
  - Chocolate Peanut Butter Cheerios (Limited edition for 2016, permanent in 2017)
  - Dark Chocolate Crunch Cheerios (2014)
  - Dulce De Leche Cheerios (2012)
  - Frosted Cheerios (1995–present)
  - Fruity Cheerios (2006–present)
  - Honey Nut Cheerios (1979–present)
  - Honey Nut Cheerios Medley Crunch (2013)
  - Maple Cheerios (2018)
  - Millenios (Cheerios) (1999–2000)
  - Multi Grain Cheerios (1991–present)
  - Multi Grain Dark Chocolate Crunch Cheerios (2014)
  - Multi Grain Peanut Butter Crunch Cheerios (2012–2018)
  - Cheerios Oat Crunch (2007–present)
  - Peach Cheerios (2018)
  - Pumpkin Spice Cheerios (2016- present, seasonal)
  - Strawberry Cheerios (2017)
  - Strawberry Banana Cheerios (2022–present)
  - Team Cheerios (1997)
  - Team (USA) Cheerios (1996) – (special edition, discontinued)
  - Toasted Coconut Cheerios (2019)
  - Vanilla Spice Cheerios (2023)
  - Very Berry Cheerios (2017–present)
  - Yogurt Burst Cheerios – Strawberry (2004)
  - Yogurt Burst Cheerios – Vanilla (2004)
- Chex – Ralcorp (1937–1997); General Mills (1997–present)
  - Apple Cinnamon Chex (2012–present)
  - Chex Clusters
  - Chocolate Chex (2007–present)
  - Cinnamon Chex (2009–present)
  - Corn Chex (1958–present)
  - Double Chex (1990s)
  - Frosted Chex
  - Frosted Mini-Chex (2002–2006)
  - Graham Chex (mid 1990s)
  - Honey Graham Chex (1986–early 1990s)
  - Honey Nut Chex (1999–present)
  - Multi-Bran Chex (1990–?)
  - Peanut Butter Chex
  - Rice Chex (1950–present)
  - Strawberry Chex (2008–2010)
  - Sugar Chex (1970s)
  - Vanilla Chex (2013–?)
  - Wheat Chex (1937–present)
- Chips Ahoy! Cereal – Post (2017)
- Choco Crunch (original) – Quaker Oats (1980s)
- Choco Crunch (re-introduced version) – Quaker Oats (2007–present)
- Chocapic – Nestlé
- Chocolate Donutz – General Mills (early 1980s)
- Chocolate Crunchfuls (2010–present)
- Chocolate Flakes – Kellogg's (not generally sold in the U.S.)
- Chocolate Peanut Butter Corn Pops – Kellogg's – (2007)
- Chrebet Crunch (1999)
- Chocolatey Peanut Butter Crunch – Quaker Oats (2006)
- Chocos – Kellogg's
- Christmas Crunch – Quaker Oats (1988–present)
- Cinnabon – Kellogg's
- Cinnamon Crunch – Quaker Oats (1970s)
- Cinnamon Crunch Crispix – Kellogg's (2001–2006)
- Cinnamon Grahams – United Kingdom
- Cinnamon Jacks – Kellogg's (2013–)
- Cinnamon Mini-Buns (1991–1993)
- Cinnamon Marshmallow Scooby-Doo – Kellogg's (2002)
- Cinnamon Streusel – General Mills
- Cinnamon Toast Crunch – General Mills (1984–present)
  - Apple Cinnamon Toast Crunch (2017)
  - Apple Pie Toast Crunch (2021)
  - Caramel Toast Crunch (2021)
  - CinnaGraham Toast Crunch (2021–present)
  - Cinnamon Toast Crunch Rolls (2022–present)
  - Cinnamon Toast Crunch Waffle (2024-present)
  - Cinnamon Toast Crunch Churros (2018–present)
  - Chocolate Toast Crunch (2013-?)
  - Dulce De Leche Toast Crunch (2021)
  - Frosted Toast Crunch (2012)
  - Peanut Butter Toast Crunch (2004, 2013)
  - Sugar Cookie Toast Crunch (2015–present, seasonal)
- Cinnamon Toasters – Malt-O-Meal
- Circus Fun – General Mills (Late 1980s)
- Clackers – General Mills
- Clusters – General Mills
- Coco Munch
- Coco Roos – Malt-O-Meal
- CoCo Wheats – Little Crow Foods (1930–present)
- Cocoa Blasts – Quaker Oats (1996)
- Coco Pops – Kellogg's (known as Cocoa Krispies in some parts of the world; the generic equivalent sold under many different names)
- Cocoa Pebbles – Post Cereals (1970-present)
- Cocoa Puffs – General Mills (1958–present)
  - Cocoa Puffs Brownie Crunch (2011)
  - Cocoa Puffs Combos (vanilla and chocolate puffs mixed) – (2008)
  - Cocoa Puffs Ice Cream Scoops (2017)
  - Hot Cocoa Cocoa Puffs (2017)•
- Cocoa Hoots – Kellogg's
- Colossal Crunch – Malt-O-Meal
- Comet Balls – Spix/Sulava & Company (2006–present)
- Complete
- Concentrate – Kellogg's (1959–c.1980)
- Cookie Crisp (1977–present)
  - Birthday Cake Cookie Crisp. (2018)
  - Cookie Crisp Brownie (2013–present) (available in the U.K.)
  - Cookie Crisp Sprinkles (2009–2012)
  - Double Chocolate Cookie Crisp (2006–2008)
  - Holiday Sprinkles Cookie Crisp (2014)
  - Oatmeal Cookie Crisp (1978–1980)
  - Peanut Butter Cookie Crisp (2005–2007)
  - Sprinkles Cookie Crisp (2009)
  - Vanilla Cookie Crisp (1978–mid 1980s)
- Corn Bran – Quaker Oats (1980)
- Corn Bran Squares – Quaker Oats
- Corn Bursts – Malt-O-Meal
- Corn Crunch – Quaker Oats (2017)
- Corn Flakes
  - Harvest Morn – Aldi
  - Kellogg's (1907–present)
  - Tesco
- Corn Pops – Kellogg's (1951–present; originally known as Sugar Pops)
  - 3 Point Pops (1999)
  - Candy Corn Pops (2001)
- Corn Soya – Kellogg's
- Corn Snaps – Kellogg's (1970s)
- Country Corn Bran – General Mills
- Country Corn Flakes – General Mills (1962)
- Cosmic Brownies Cereal – Kellogg's (2021)
- Count Chocula (1971–present / seasonal since 2010)
- Cracklin' Oat Bran Kellogg's
- Cracker Jack Cereal – Ralston (1983–1985)
- Cranberry Almond Crunch – Post Cereals (1997–present)
- Cranberry Wheats – Asda
- Cran-Vanilla Crunch – Kellogg's (2005–2007)
- Crazy Cow – General Mills (late 1970s)
  - Crazy Cow Chocolate (1977)
  - Crazy Cow Strawberry (1977)
- Cream of Wheat (1893–present)
- Create a Crunch Cereal Making Kit – Post Cereals (Early 2000s)
- Crispix – Kellogg's – (1983–present)
- Crispy Critters – Post Cereals (1963–1980s)
- Crispy Wheats 'n Raisins – (no longer in production)
- Cröonchy Stars – Post Cereals (1988–1989) featuring the Muppets' Swedish Chef
- Cruncheroos – Kellogg's (1990s)
- Crunchy Bran – Quaker Oats
- Crunchy Bran – Weetabix Limited
- Crunchy Corn Bran – Quaker Oats
- Crunchy Nut Cornflakes – Kellogg's
- Crunchy Nut Oh!s – Quaker Oats
- Cuphead & Mugman – Funko
- Curves – General Mills (2007)
  - Curves Fruit & Nut Crunch Curves Honey Crunch (2007)
  - Curves Whole Grain Crunch (2007)

== D ==
- Despicable Me Cereal – Kellogg's (2017)
- Diamond Shreddies – General Mills/Cereal Partners
- Diet Frosted Rice Puffs – Quaker Oats (1967)
- Diet Frosted Wheat Puffs – Quaker Oats (1967)
- Dinersaurs – Ralston (1988–1989)
- Dinky Donuts – Ralston (1980s)
- Dino Bites - Market Basket
- Dippin Dots Cereal – General Mills (2018)
  - Banana Split
  - Birthday Cake
  - Cookies n’ Cream
- Donkey Kong Crunch – Ralston (1982–1983)
- Donkey Kong Jr. Cereal – Ralston (1983–1984)
- Dora the Explorer Cereal – General Mills
- Double Dip Crunch – Kellogg's (late 1980s–1993)
- Drumstick Cereal – General Mills (2019)
  - Classic Vanilla
  - Mint Chocolate
- Dudley Do-Right – General Mills
- Dunkaroos Cereal – General Mills (2021–present)
- Dunkin' Donuts Cereal – Ralston (late 1980s)
- Dunkin' Caramel Macchiato (Post) (2020)
- Dunkin' Mocha Latte (Post) (2020)
- Dutch Apple – General Mills (1996)
- Dyno-Bites – Malt-O-Meal

== E ==
- Eggo – Kellogg's (2006–2012, 2019–present)
- E.T. Cereal – Ralston (1984)
- The Elf on the Shelf Cereal – Kellogg's – (2019)
- Engine 2 (Rip's Big Bowl) – Whole Foods
- Elixir Cereals – Known by brand name Nutri-Crisp (2011–present)

== F ==
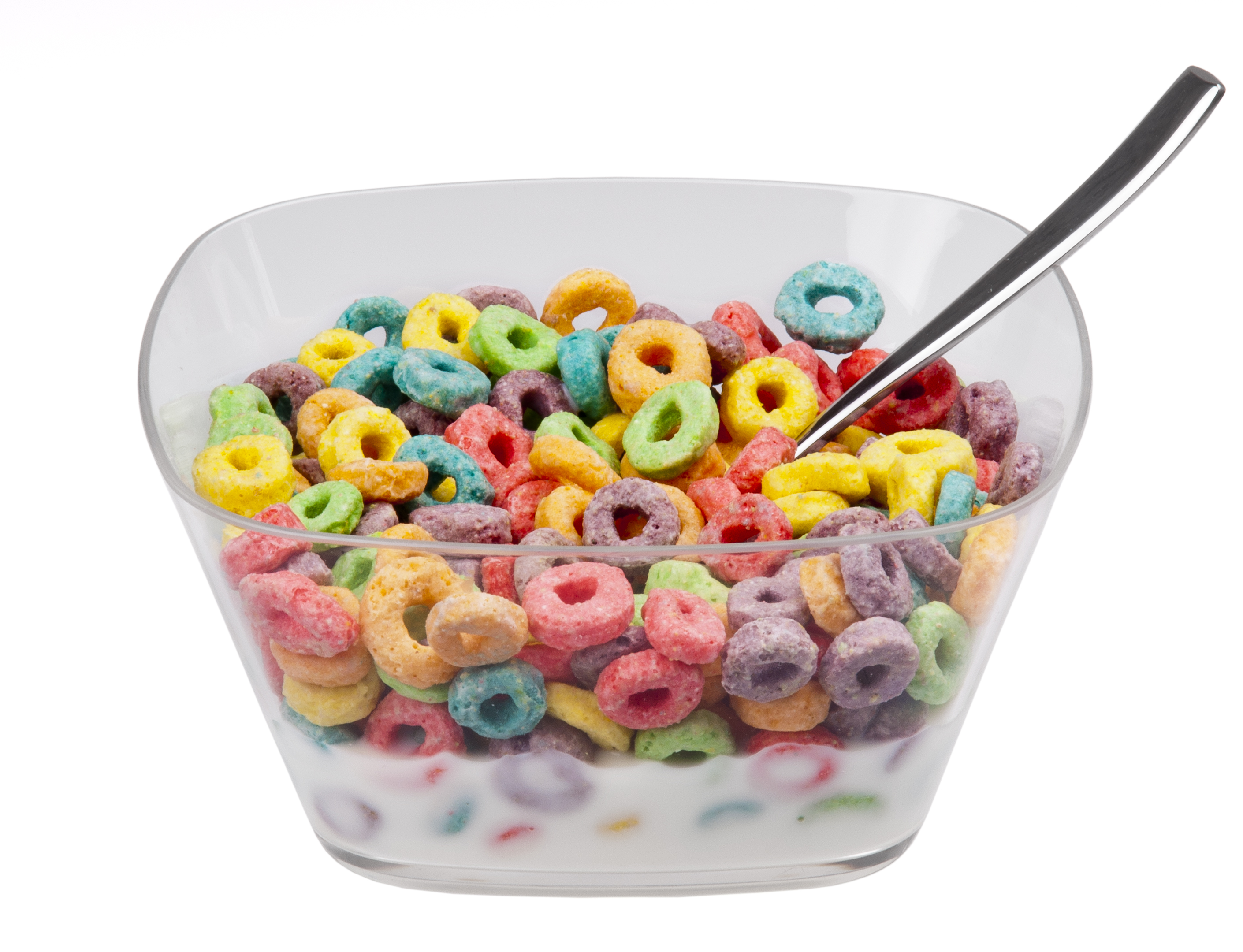
Froot Loops

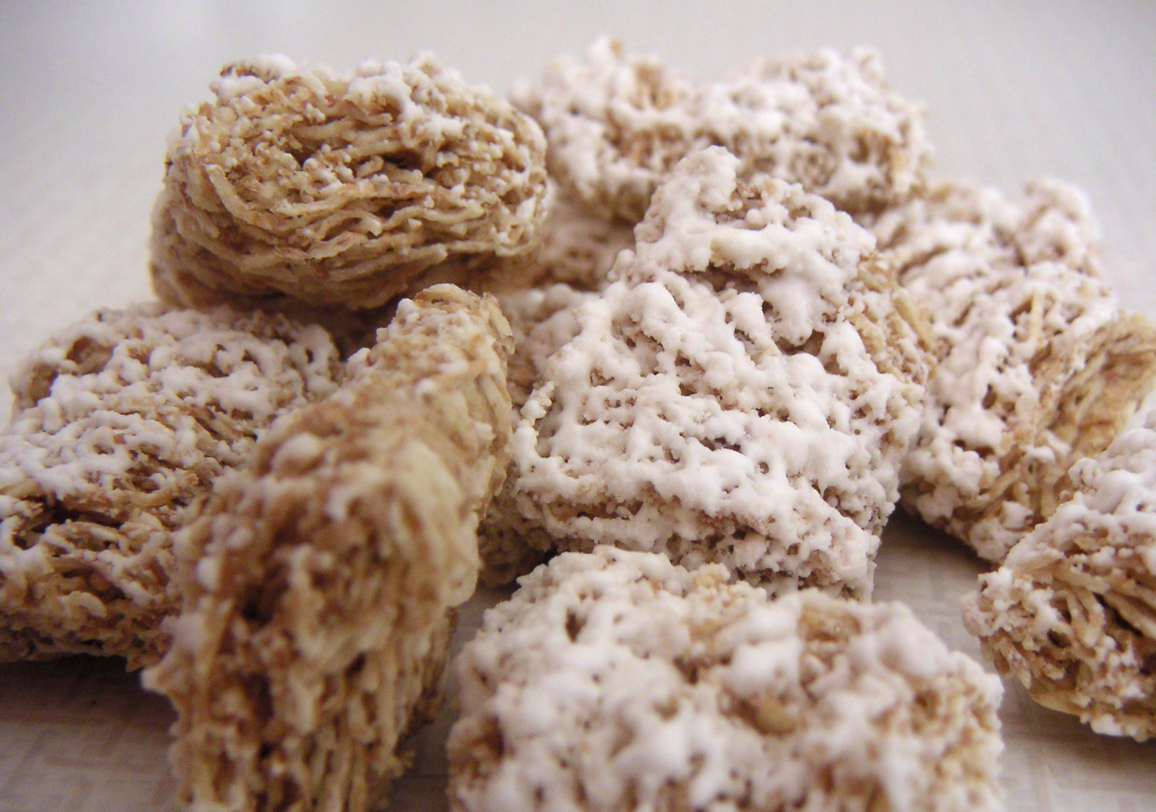
Frosted Mini Wheats

- The Fairly OddParents Cereal! – Post Cereals (2003–2004)
- Fantuz Flakes – Prepared for Federated Co-operatives Ltd, Collectors Edition for Saskatchewan Roughriders 100th season (2009–2010)
- Farley's Rusks Original
- Fiber One – General Mills (1985–present)
  - Fiber One Caramel Delight (2008)
  - Fiber One Frosted Shredded Wheat (2009)
  - Fiber One Honey Clusters (2005–present)
  - Fiber One Raisin Bran Clusters (2007)
  - Fiber One Strawberries & Vanilla Clusters (2019)
  - Fiber One 80 Chocolate (2013)
  - Fiber One 80 Honey Squares (2011)
  - Fiber One Bran
  - Fiber One Protein Cranberry Almond (2014)
  - Fiber One Protein Maple Brown Sugar (2014)
- Fillows – General Mills (2019)
  - Fillows Pillsbury Cinnamon Roll (2019)
  - Fillows Hershey’s Cookies n' Crème (2019)
- Finding Dory – Kellogg's (2016)
- Fingos – General Mills (1993 to 1994)
- Football Crisp! – Nestlé (2006)
- Force – (1901–1983 in the U.S.; 1902–present in the UK)
- Fortified Oat Flakes – Post Cereals
- Franken Berry (1971–present / seasonal since 2010)
- Freakies – Ralston (1972–1976; reintroduced version 1987)
  - Cocoa Freakies – (1973–present)
  - Fruity Freakies – (1975–1976)
- French Toast Crunch – General Mills (1995–present)
- Froot Loops – Kellogg's (1964–present)
  - Froots Loops Treasures Cereal – Kellogg's (2013–present)
- Frosted Flakes – Kellogg's (known as Frosties in much of Europe; formerly known as Sugar Frosted Flakes (1952 – present))
  - Banana Frosted Flakes (1981–1984)
  - Birthday Confetti Frosted Flakes (1997)
  - Cocoa Frosted Flakes (1997–2000)
  - Less Sugar Frosted Flakes (2004–present)
  - Frosted Flakes Gold (2008–present)
  - Frosted Flakes Chocolate (2011 & 2013) (marketed as Kombos in the 1970s)
  - Frosted Flakes Minecraft (2023)
  - Cinnamon Frosted Flakes (2016–present)
  - Honey Nut Frosted Flakes (2019–present)
  - Banana Creme Frosted Flakes (2019)
  - Strawberry Milkshake Frosted Flakes (2022–present)
  - Maple Cinnamon Frosted Flakes (2022-2024)
- Frosted Flakes – Malt-O-Meal
- Frosted Flakes – Ralston
- Frosted Mini Spooners – Malt-O-Meal
- Frosted Mini-Wheats (various flavors) – Kellogg's
  - Frosted Mini-Wheats Strawberry Delight
  - Bite Size Frosted Mini-Wheats with Brown Sugar
  - Bite Size Frosted Blueberry Muffin
  - Bite Size Frosted Cinnamon Streusel
  - Bite Size Frosted Chocolate
  - Bite Size Frosted Maple and Brown Sugar
  - Bite Size Frosted Strawberry Delight
  - Bite Size Frosted Vanilla Crème
  - Frosted Mini-Wheats Big Bite
  - Unfrosted Mini-Wheats
  - Little Bites Original
  - Little Bites Chocolate
  - Touch of Fruit in the Middle Mixed Berry
- Frosted Oat Flakes – Quaker Oats (1968)
- Frosted Shredded Wheat – see Shredded Wheat
- Frosties – see Frosted Flakes
- Frosty O's – General Mills (1959-early 1980s) (eventually repackaged as "Frosted Cheerios")
- Fruitangy Oh!s – Quaker Oats
- Fruit & Bran – Post Cereals (discontinued)
- Fruit & Nut Granola Cereal – Sunbelt
- Fruit 'n Fibre
  - (including spelling variants) Kellogg's, others
  - Fruit & Fibre (Crownfield) – Lidl
  - Fruit & Fibre (Harvest Morn) – Aldi
- Fruit Harvest
- Fruit Islands – Ralston (1987)
- Fruit Wheats – Nabisco (1986)
- Fruity Dyno-bites – Malt-O-Meal
- Fruity Pebbles – Post Cereals
- Funfetti Cereal – Pillsbury (2020)
- FunkO's
- Futurelife SmartFood

== G ==
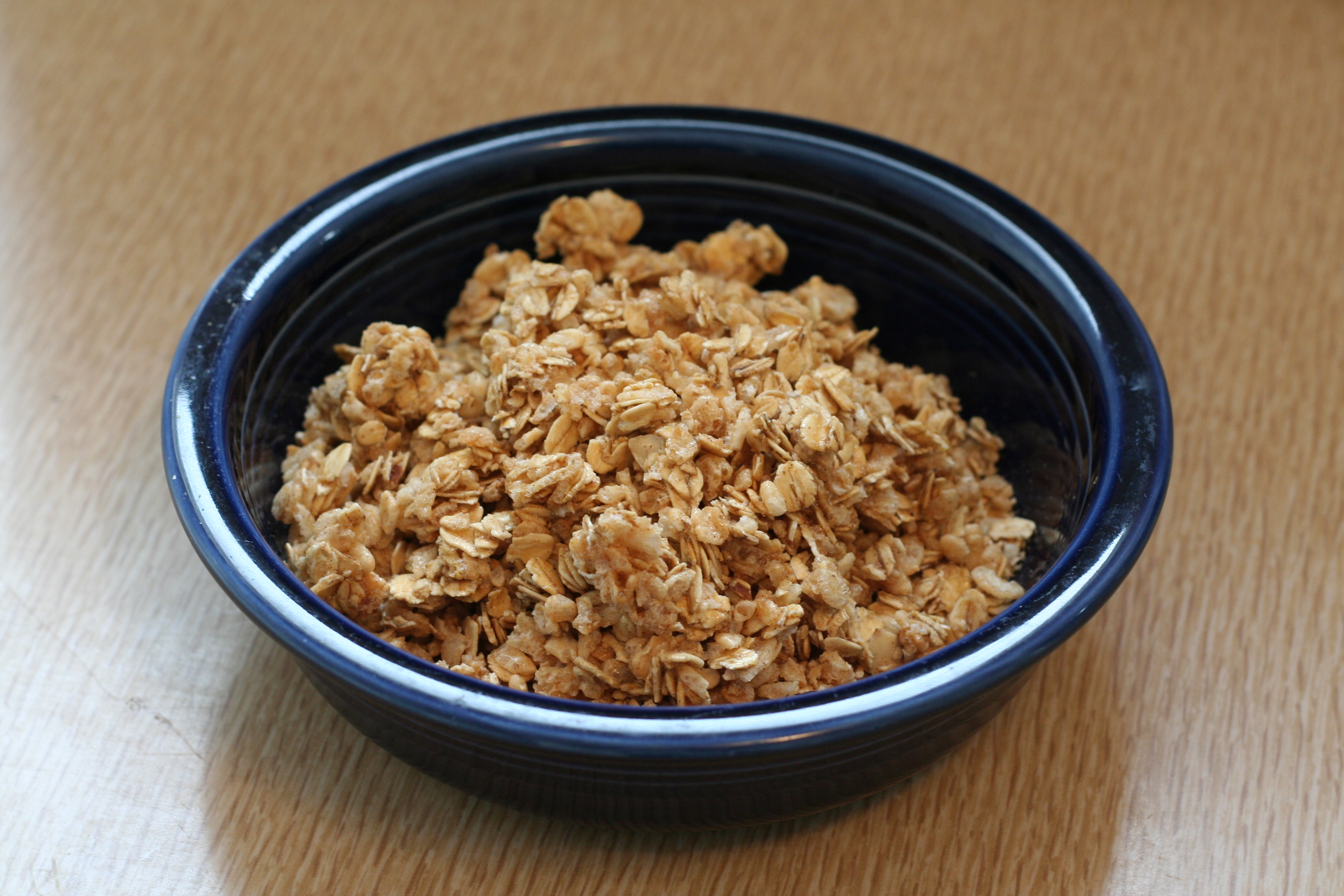
Granola

- Garfield Cereal – Quaker Oats (1985)
- G.I. Joe Action Stars – Ralston (1985)
- Girl Scouts Cereal – General Mills (2017)
  - Caramel Crunch
  - Thin Mints
- Ghostbusters Cereal – Ralston (1985–1988)
- Ghostbusters II Cereal – Ralston (1989)
- Ghostbusters: Afterlife Cereal – General Mills (2021)
- Go Lean Cereal (Crunch) – Kashi
- Golden Crisp – Post Cereals (formerly known as Sugar Crisp, Super Sugar Crisp, and Super Golden Crisp; 1949–present)
- Go Diego Go! Cereal – General Mills (2015)
- Golden Goals – Quaker
- Golden Grahams – General Mills (1970s–present)
- Golden Nuggets – United Kingdom – Nestlé
- Golden Oaties – Quaker (c.1982)
- Golden Puffs – Malt-O-Meal
- Gold Medal Raisin Bran – General Mills (2001)
- Good Friends Cereal (fiber cereal) – Kashi/Kellogg's
- Gorilla Munch – Nature's Path
- Gran Bits – Australia Hancock's Golden Crust Pty Ltd (1931–2001)
- Grand Slams – General Mills (1998)
- Granola
  - Granolove – honey roasted granola; Springfield, Missouri
  - Kellogg's; 1900s
  - Low Fat Granola Cereal – Sunbelt
  - Oatbox Cereal Co. – Cranberry, Rosemary & Raw Cocoa Nibs Granola (2014)
  - Oatbox Cereal Co. – Chai Tea & Roasted Pineapple Granola (2014)
  - Oatbox Cereal Co. – Old fashioned Apple Crumble Granola (2014)
  - Oatbox Cereal Co. – Pumpkin Spice Granola (2014)
  - Quaker 100% Natural Granola
  - Specially Selected Very Berry Granola – Aldi
  - W.K Kellogg No Added Sugar Simply Granola
- Granula – first manufactured breakfast cereal, invented by James Caleb Jackson in 1863
- Grape Nut Flakes – Post
- Grape-Nuts – Post Cereals (1897–present)
- Grape-Nuts O's - Post Cereals (discontinued)
- Gremlins cereal – Ralston (1984)
- Grins & Smiles & Giggles & Laughs – Ralston (discontinued)
- Guardian Cinnamon with a hint of vanilla flavour – Canada – Kellogg's
- Guardian Original with a hint of maple flavour – Canada – Kelloggs
- Grain Berry multi bran flakes with onyx sorghum – Grain Berry Mills

== H ==
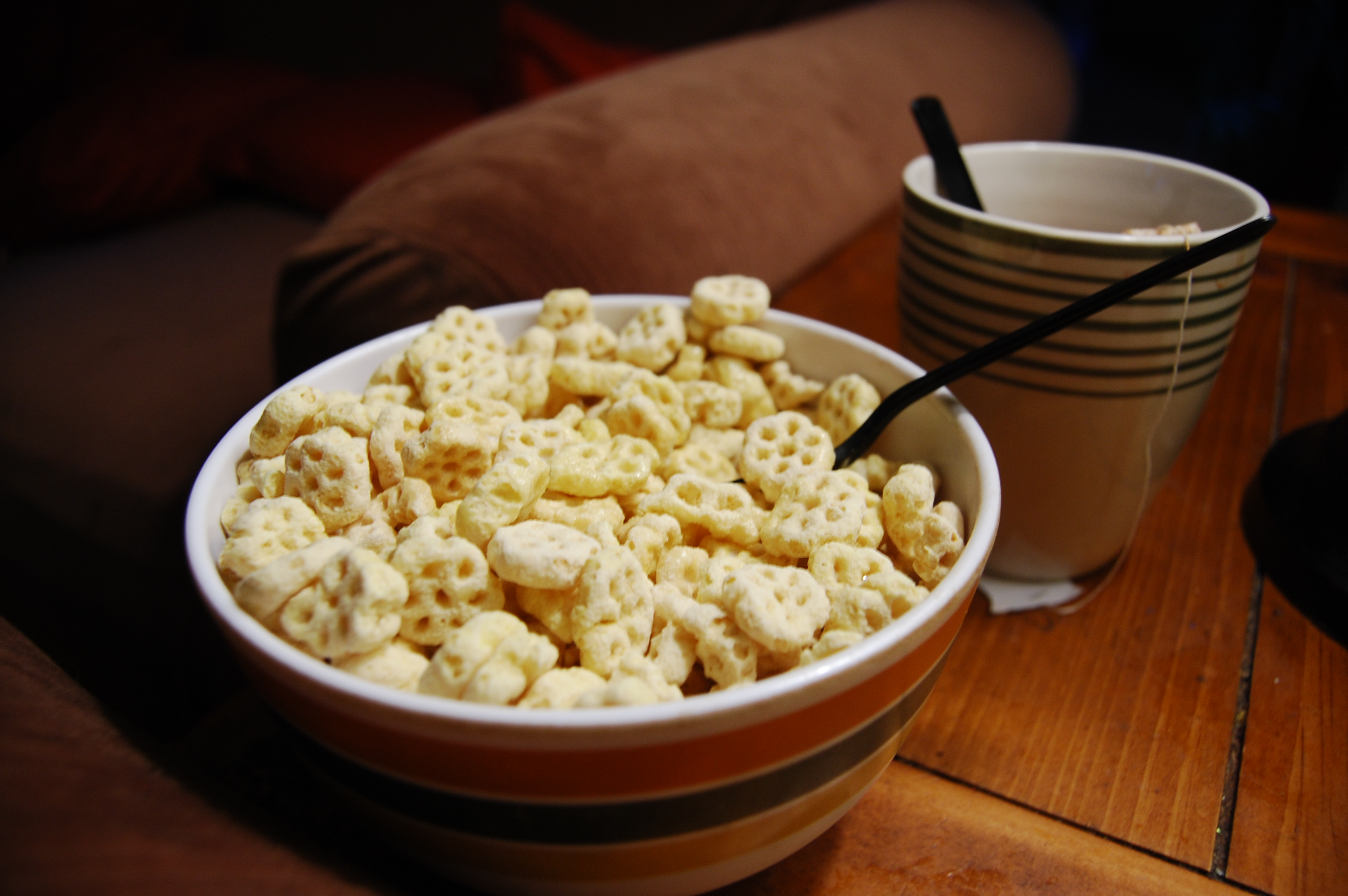
Honeycomb

- Halfsies – Quaker Oats (1980s)
- Harmony – General Mills (2001)
- Harvest Crunch – Quaker Oats
- Heart to Heart – Blueberry Oat Cluster Crunch – Kashi
- Hershey's Cookies 'n' Creme Cereal – General Mills (2013–present)
- Hershey's Kisses Cereal – General Mills (2019–present)
- High School Musical Cereal – Kellogg's/Disney (2008)
- Hi-Pro – General Mills (1960)
- Homer's Cinnamon Donut Cereal – Kellogg's (c.2001)
- Honey Bunches of Oats (1989–present)
  - Honey Bunches of Oats with Almonds (1990–present)
  - Honey Bunches of Oats with Apples with Cinnamon Bunches (2011–present)
  - Honey Bunches of Oats with Bananas (2004–2005)
  - Honey Bunches of Oats with Peaches (2004 – November 2011)
  - Honey Bunches of Oats with Strawberries (2002–present)
  - Honey Bunches of Oats with Chocolate Clusters (2008–present)
  - Honey Bunches of Oats with Cinnamon Clusters (2006–2012)
  - Honey Bunches of Oats with Vanilla Clusters (2007–present)
  - Honey Bunches of Oats Just Bunches (2008–present)
  - Honey Bunches of Oats Fruit Blends (2012–present)
  - Chicken & Waffles Honey Bunches of Oats – Post Cereals
  - Maple Bacon Donuts Honey Bunches of Oats – Post Cereals
- Honey Bunny
- Honey Buzzers – Malt-O-Meal
- Honeycomb – Post Cereals (1965–present)
  - Honeycomb Strawberry
- Honey Crisp Corn Flakes – Quaker Oats
- Honey Cups
- Honey Dipps – Quaker Oats (2019)
- Honey-ful Wheat – Mom's Best Naturals
- Honey Graham Oh's – Quaker Oats
- Honey Graham Squares – Malt-O-Meal
- Honey Maid – Post Cereals (2007–2008)
- Honey Nut Clusters – General Mills
- Honey Crisps – Honeywell Cereals
- Raisin Crisps – Honeywell Cereals
- Honey Nut Corn Flakes – Kellogg's (1981–present)
- Honey Nut Shredded Wheat – Post
- Honey Nut Toasty O's – Mom's Best Naturals
- Honey & Oat Blenders – Malt-O-Meal
- Honey Puffs
- Honey Smacks – Kellogg's (formerly known as Sugar Smacks) (1953–present)
- Honey Toasted Kernza – Cascadian Farms, General Mills (2019)
- Honey-Toasted Sugar Puffs – Quaker Oats
- Hostess – Post Cereals
- Hot Wheels – Ralston (1990)
- How to Train Your Dragon Adventure Crunch – MOM Brands (2015)
- Hulk Cereal – Post (2003)
- Disney Hunny B's Honey-Graham – Kellogg's/Disney (2002–2006)
- Hy-Vee Mahomes Magic Crunch – Hy-Vee (2019)
- Honey Stars – Nestlé

== I ==
- Ice Cream Cones – (1987) (limited edition availability in 2003)
  - Ice Cream Cones Chocolate Chip
  - Ice Cream Cones Vanilla
- Icee Cereal – Kellogg’s (2023)
- Indiana Jones – Kellogg's – (2008–2009)
- Instant Hot Oat Cereal (Harvest Morn) – Aldi – see Ready Brek

== J ==
- JoJo Siwa Strawberry Bop Cereal – General Mills (2021)
- Jolly Rancher Cereal – General Mills (2020)
- Jurassic Park Crunch – General Mills (1997)
- Jets – General Mills (c. late 1950s to early 1970s)
- Just Right – Kellogg's

== K ==
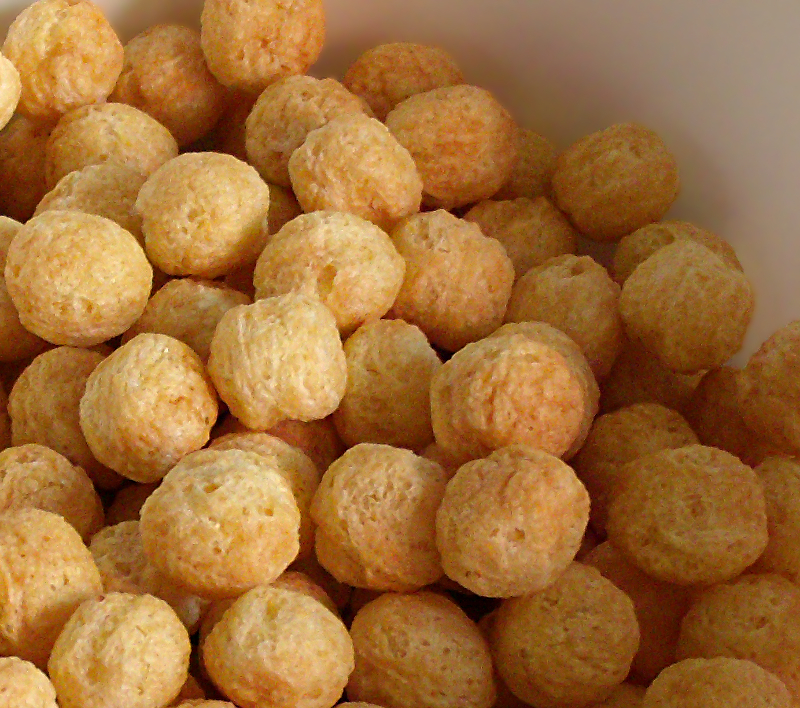
Kix

- Kaboom! – General Mills (1969–2010: Limited Distribution)
- Kashi – Indigo Morning, NON GMO, Organic
- KamB8s Frosted Nuts-Organic (1996–present)
- Keebler Cereal – Kellogg's (2016)
- Keebler Cookie Crunch Cereal – Kellogg's (2008–2010)
- King Vitaman – Quaker Oats (1970–2019)
- Kix – General Mills (1937–present)
  - Berry Berry Kix – (1992–present)
  - Honey Kix – (2009–present)
- Kosmostars – Nestlé
- Koko Krunch – Nestlé – (Asia
- Krave U.S Version – Kellogg's – (2012–present)
  - Chocolate Krave – (2012–present)
  - Cinnamon Crunch Krave – (2019)
  - Double Chocolate Krave – (2012–present)
  - S'mores Krave – (2014–present)
  - Strawberry Crunch Krave – (2019)
- Krispy Kritters (1960s–1980s) General Foods
- Krumbles-Kellogg's (1913–1973 [approx])
- Krusty-O's – fictional breakfast cereal, one of the many products produced from The Simpsons. This cereal was produced in limited quantities and sold at 7-Eleven convenience stores as a promotional item for The Simpsons Movie.
- Kung Fu Panda Crunchers cereal – Kellogg's / DreamWorks (2008)

== L ==
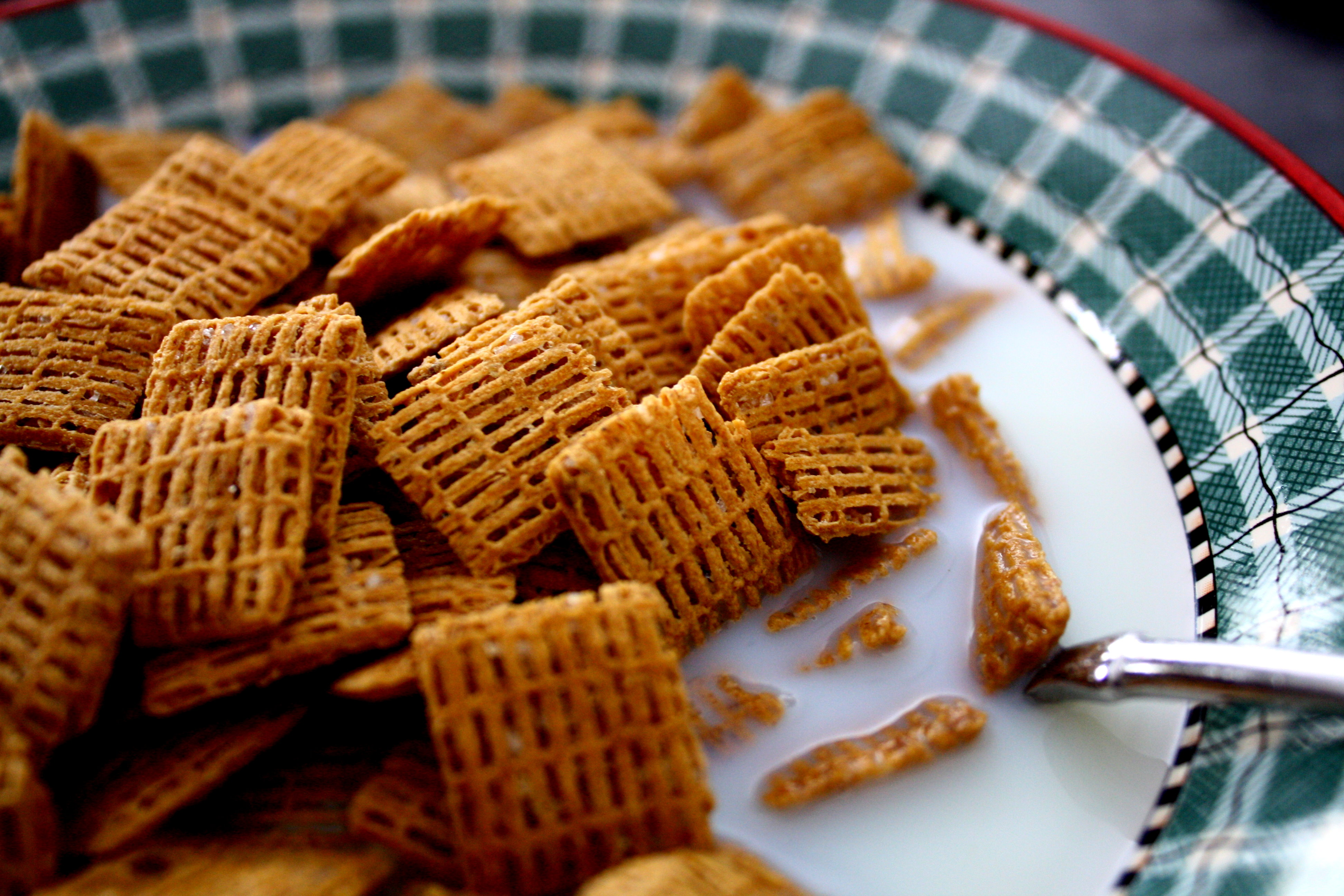
Life

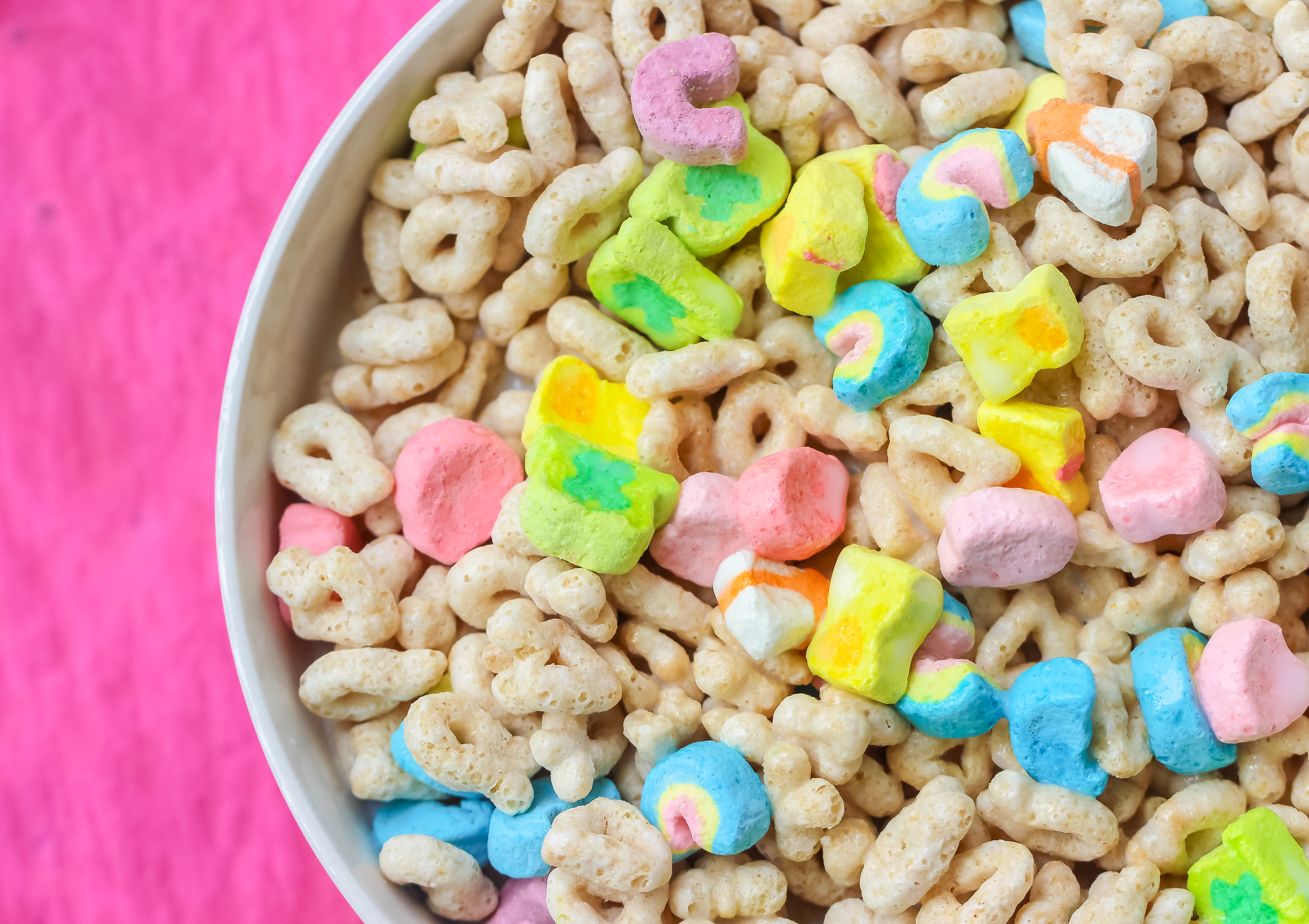
Lucky Charms

- La Lechera Flakes – Nestlé
  - La Lechera Churros
- Life – Quaker (1960s–present)
  - Baked Apple Life – (2002)
  - Cinnamon Life – (1978–present)
  - Chocolate Life (discontinued)
  - Chocolate Oat Crunch Life – (2006–2008)
  - Crunchtime Life Apple Cinnamon (2012)
  - Crunchtime Life Strawberry (2012)
  - Gingerbread Spice Life (2017)
  - Honey Graham Life – (2004–2009)
  - Maple & Brown Sugar Life – (2008–?)
  - Multi Grain Life
  - Pumpkin Spice Life (2016)
  - Raisin Life – (Mid 1980s)
  - Strawberry Life
  - Superman Returns Life (2006)
  - Vanilla Life (2016–present) (Now known as Mighty Life Very Vanilla)
  - Vanilla Yogurt Crunch Life – (2005 – July 2008)
- Liga Original
- Lion Cereal – Nestlé
- Little Einsteins Fruity Stars – General Mills
- Looney Tunes Back In Action – General Mills (2003)
- Lucky Charms – General Mills (1964–present)
  - Berry Lucky Charms (2006–2009)
  - Cinnamon Vanilla Lucky Charms (2017)
  - Chocolate Lucky Charms (2005–present)
  - Chocolatey Winter Lucky Charms (2018)
  - Fruity Lucky Charms (2019)
  - Holiday Lucky Charms (1991)
  - Olympic Lucky Charms (1996)
  - Winter Lucky Charms (1999)←
- Lucky Charms Frosted Flakes – General Mills (2018)

== M ==
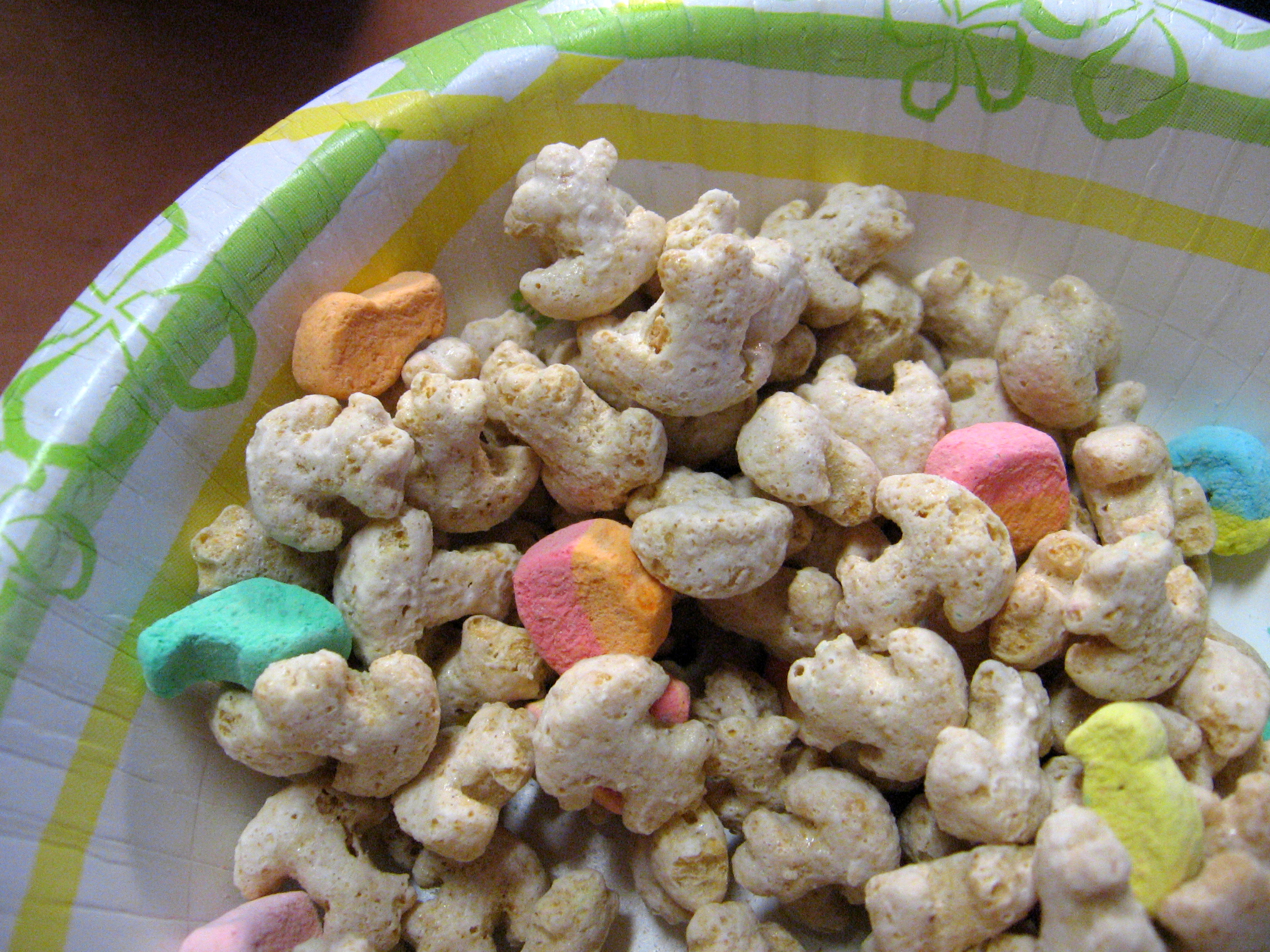
Marshmallow Mateys

- Madagascar S'more Jungle Party – MOM Brands, Post Cereals (2015)
- Magic Puffs Cereal – General Mills (1970s)
- Magic Spoon
- Major League Grand Slams – General Mills (1998)
- Mallow Oats – Mom's Best Cereals
- Malted Wheaties (Harvest Morn) – Aldi – see Shreddies
- Malt Wheats – Tesco – see Shreddies
- Maple & Brown Sugar Mini Spooners – Malt-O-Meal
- Maple Waffle – Magic Spoon(2021)
- Marshmallow Alpha-Bits – Post Cereals
- Marshmallow Mateys – Malt-O-Meal
- Marshmallow Safari – Quaker Oats
- Master Crunch – Master P
- Maximize – Bokomo
- Mega Man – Funko
- Mermaid – General Mills (2019)
- Mickey's Magix – Kellogg's/Disney (2002–2005)
- Mickey Mouse Magic Crunch – Post (1988–1989)
- Mickey Mouse Clubhouse Berry Crunch – General Mills
- Maypo
- Millenios – General Mills (1999)
- Milo Cereal – Nestlé
- Milo Crunchy Bites – Nestlé
- Milo Duo – Nestlé
- Minecraft Creeper Crunch - Kellogg's (2020-2022)
- Mini Cinnamon Churros – Post Cereals (2011–present)
- Mini Swirlz Cinnamon Bun Cereal – Kellogg's – (2005–2009)
- Mini Swirlz Fudge Ripple Cereal – Kellogg's (2005–2007)
- Mini Swirlz Peanut Butter Blast Cereal – Kellogg's (2006–2007)
- Mini-Wheats – Kellogg's – (1978–present)
- Minions – General Mills (2015)
- Monopoly Cereal – General Mills (2003)
- Monster Cereals – General Mills (1971–present / seasonal since 2010)
  - Boo Berry – General Mills (1973–present / seasonal since 2010)
  - Count Chocula – General Mills (1971–present / seasonal since 2010)
  - Franken Berry – General Mills (1971–present / seasonal since 2010)
  - Fruit Brute – General Mills (1974–1984) New Version (2013; renamed Frute Brute)
  - Fruity Yummy Mummy – General Mills (1988–1993) New Version (2013)
  - Carmella Creeper – General Mills (2023–present / seasonal since 2023)
- Monsters University Cereal – Kellogg's (2013)
- Moonstones – Ralston (1970s)
- Morning Funnies – Ralston (1988–1989)
- Most
- Mr. T Cereal – Quaker Oats (1984)
- Mr. Wonderful's Surprize – General Mills (1970s)
  - Mr. Wonderful's Suprize Chocolate (1972)
  - Mr. Wonderful's Suprize Vanilla (1972)
- Mud & Bugs – Kellogg's/Disney (2003–2006)
- Muesli
  - Gaia Muesli
  - Harvest Morn Fruit Muesli – Aldi
  - Harvest Morn Fruit & Nut Muesli – Aldi
  - Kelkin Fruit & Nut Muesli
  - Specially Selected Berries & Cherries Muesli – Aldi
  - Specially Selected Really Nutty Muesli – Aldi
  - Specially Selected Very Berry Muesli – Aldi
  - Tesco No Added Sugar Or Salt Swiss Style Muesli
- Mueslix – Kellogg's (1980s–present)
- Muffets – Quaker
- Multigrain Flakes – Quaker Oats (2018)
  - Cranberry Apple
  - Honey Vanilla

== N ==
- Natural Granola – Quaker Oats
  - Lowfat With Raisins
  - Oats & Honey
  - Oats, Honey & Raisins
- Nature Valley Cereal – General Mills (1970s–present)
  - Nature Valley Baked Oat Bites (201)
  - Nature Valley Chocolate Oat Bites (2016)
  - Nature Valley Chocolate Oat Clusters (2016)
  - Nature Valley Cinnamon (2007)
  - Nature Valley Granola (1973–present)
  - Nature Valley Oats n’ Honey (2007)
  - Nature Valley Organic Vanilla Nut (discontinued)
  - Nature Valley Honey Oat Clusters (2016)
- Negresco Cereal – Nestlé (2023–present; only sold in Brazil)
- Neopets Islandberry Crunch – General Mills (2006)
- Nerds Cereal – Ralston (1985–1986)
- Nescau Cereal – Nestlé (1996–present; only sold in Brazil)
  - Nescau Duo (2012–present)
- Nestlé NesQuik – General Mills/Nestlé (1999–present)
- Nickelodeon Green Slime Cereal – General Mills (2003)
- Nintendo Cereal System – Ralston/Nintendo (1988–1989)
- Nut 'n Honey – Kellogg's
- Nutri-Grain – Kellogg's
- Nion-Nion – Achalandage
- Nutter Butter – Post (2018)

== O ==
- Oatbake – Kellogg's (early 1990s)
- Oat Bran – Quaker Oats
- Oatmeal Crisp – General Mills (originally Oatmeal Raisin Crisp, now in multiple varieties)
  - Oatmeal Crisp Almond
  - Oatmeal Crisp Crunchy Almond
  - Oatmeal Crisp Hearty Raisin
  - Oatmeal Crisp Maple Brown Sugar (2006)
  - Oatmeal Crisp Raisin (1991)
  - Oatmeal Crisp Triple Berry
  - Oatmeal Raisin Crisp
- Oat Flakes – Quaker Oats
- Oatmeal Squares – Quaker Oats (originally or previously Oat Squares)
  - Oatmeal Squares Brown Sugar (1988-present)
  - Oatmeal Squares Cinnamon
  - Oatmeal Squares Golden Maple (2009)
  - Oatmeal Squares Honey Nut (2012-present)
- Oatibix – Weetabix Limited (2006–present)
- Oat Crisp – Quaker Oats (late 1990s?–present) (replacement for Oat Krunchies)
- Oat Krunchies – Quaker Oats (1970s–late 1990s?) (replaced by Crisp then Oat Crisp)
- Oats & Honey Blend – Mom's Best Naturals
- Oh's – Quaker Oats Company (mid-1980s)
- "oho!" breakfast cereals (1991)
- O.J.s – Kellogg's (1980s)
- OKs – Kellogg's (early 1960s)
- Optima Fruit & Fibre – see Fruit 'n Fibre
- Optivita – Kellogg's (Available in The UK)
- Orange Blossom – General Mills (1981)
- Organic Wild Puffs – Barbara's Bakery
- Oreo O's – Post (1998–2007) (Reintroduced 2018–Present)
  - Golden Oreo O's – Post (2018–present)

== P ==
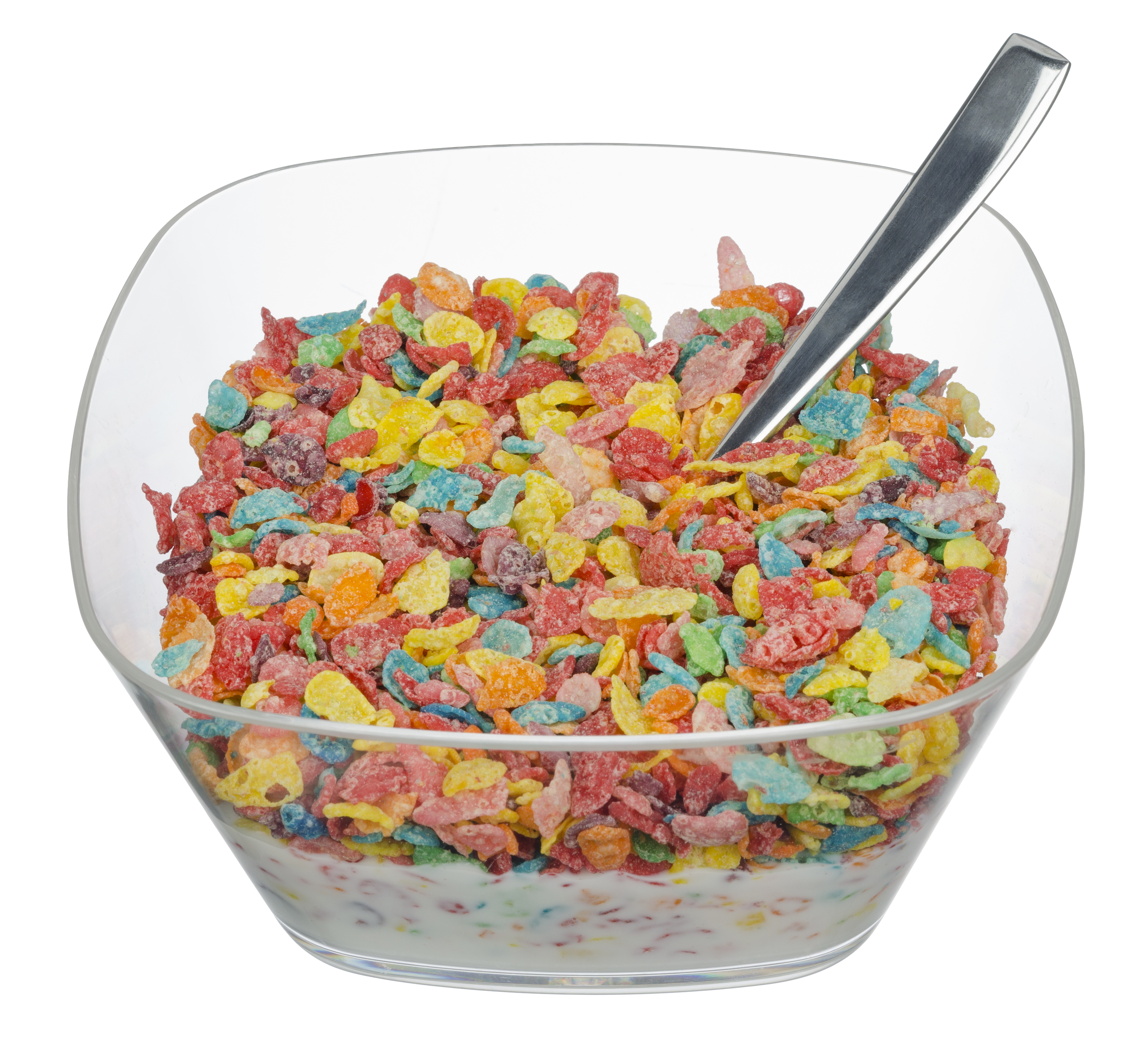
Fruity Pebbles

- Pac-Man – General Mills (early 1980s)
- Palaseja – Lithuania (1994)
- Para Su Familia Cinnamon Stars – General Mills (1999)
- Para Su Familia Raisin Bran – General Mills (1999)
- Passatempo – Nestlé (2022–present; only sold in Brazil)
- PAW Patrol – Kellogg's
- PAW Patrol Vanilla Crunch – General Mills
- PB&J – Quaker Oats (1982)
- Peanut Butter Puffs – Milville (2019)
- Peanut Butter Toast Crunch – General Mills (2004–2005) (2013–present)
- Pebbles Cereal – Post Cereals (1969–present)
  - Bamm-Bamm Berry Pebbles – Post (2007–2009)
  - Cinna-Crunch Pebbles – Post Cereals (1998–2001)
  - Cinnamon Pebbles – Post Cereals (2016–)
  - Cocoa Pebbles – Post Cereals (1970–present)
  - Cupcake Pebbles – Post Cereals (2009–2011)
  - Dino Pebbles – Post Cereals (early 1990s)
  - Dino S'mores Pebbles – Post Cereals (2008)
  - Fruity Pebbles – Post Cereals (1969–present)
  - IceBerry Pebbles – Post Cereals (2006–2007)
  - Limited Edition Smurfs Pebbles – Post Cereals (2011)
  - Marshmallow Mania Pebbles – Post Cereals (2005–2007)
  - Marshmallow Pebbles – Post Cereals (2010–)
  - Pebbles Boulders – Post Cereals (2011–)
  - Poppin' Pebbles – Post Cereals (2014–)
  - Winter Fruity Pebbles – Post Cereals (2003)
- Peeps – Kellogg's
- Pep – Kellogg's
- Pink Panther Flakes – Post Cereals (1972–1974)
- Pirates of the Caribbean Cereal – Kellogg's (2006–2007)
- Pokémon Cereal – Kellogg's (2000)
- Popeye Cereal – Purity Mills (1949–1983), Quaker Oats (1983–1990s)
  - Popeye Cocoa Blasts (1993)
  - Popeye Fruit Curls
  - Popeye Puffed Rice
  - Popeye Puffed Wheat
  - Popeye Sweet Crunch
  - Popeye Sweet Puffs
- Pop-Tarts Crunch – Kellogg's (1995)
- Porridge
  - Flahavan's Progress Oatlets
  - Kavanagh's Porridge – Aldi
- Powdered Donutz – General Mills (early 1980s)
- Princess Fairytale Flakes – General Mills (2007)
- Product 19 – Kellogg's (1967–2016)
- Pro Grain Cereal – Kellogg's (1987–1988)
- Pro Stars (feat. Wayne Gretzky on the covers) – General Mills
- Prophet's Pastry Pops – Amber Franklin Cereal Products (2013–present)
- Pronutro – Bokomo, South Africa
- Puff – Kashi
- Puffa Puffa Rice – Kellogg's (1967–1975)
- Puffed Rice – (Quaker Oats) (Malt-O-Meal)
- Puffed Rice Sparkies – Quaker Oats (1940)
- Puffed Wheat – (Quaker Oats) (Malt-O-Meal)
- Puffed Wheat Sparkies – Quaker Oats (1940)
- Puff-kins – Weetabix UK (c.1960)
- Puffins – Barbara's Bakery (early 1990s)

== Q ==
- Quake – Quaker Oats (1965–1970)
- Quake Quangaroos – Quaker Oats (1971–1974)
- Quaker Crackels – Quaker Oats
- Quaker Corn Puffs – Quaker Oats
- Quaker Honey Grahams – Quaker Oats
- Quaker Oatmeal Squares – Quaker Oats
- Quaker Wheat Berries – Quaker Oats
- Quakies – Quaker Oats (1920)
- Quisp – Quaker Oats (1965 – sold online and in limited distribution)

== R ==
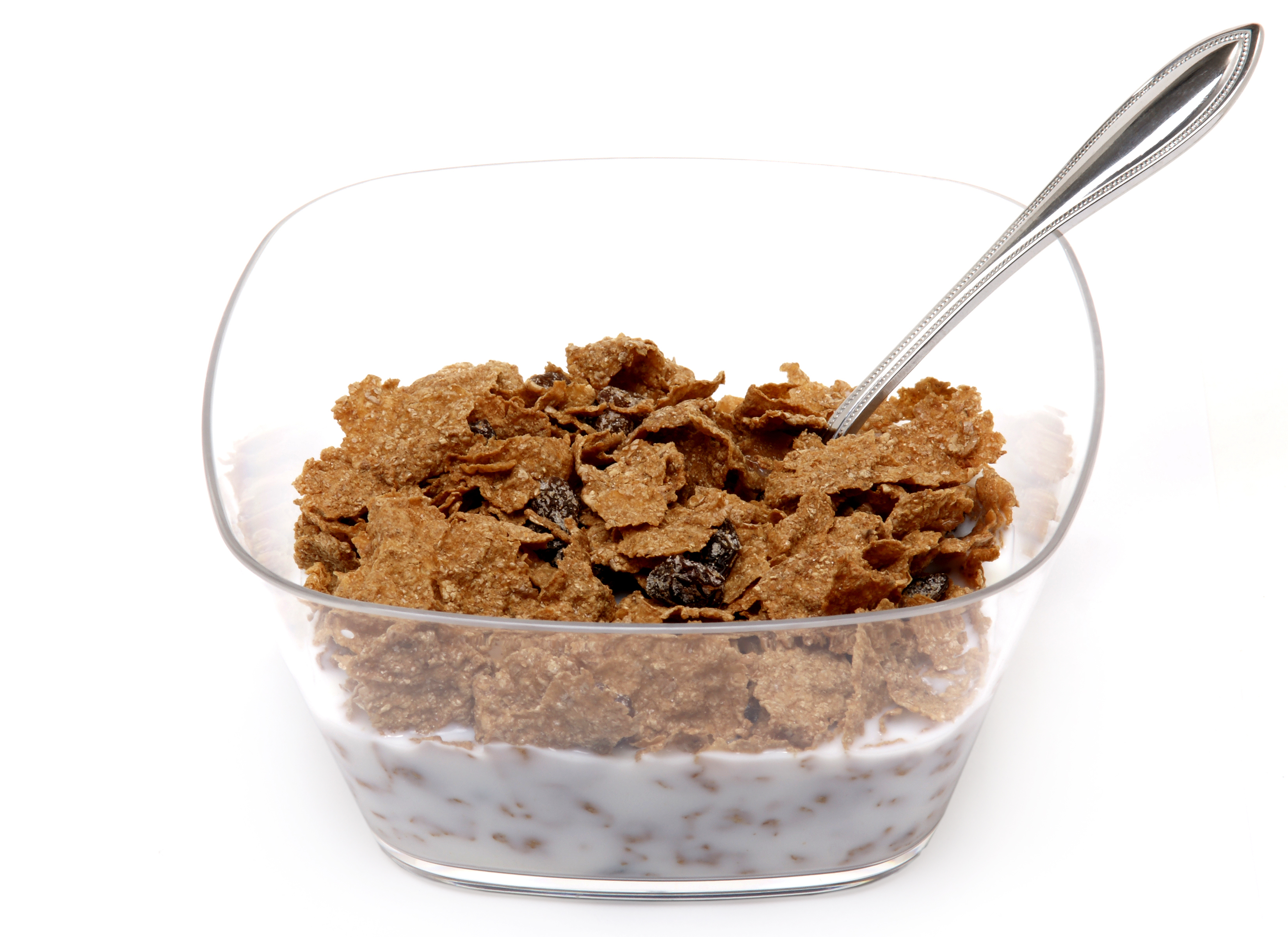
Raisin Bran

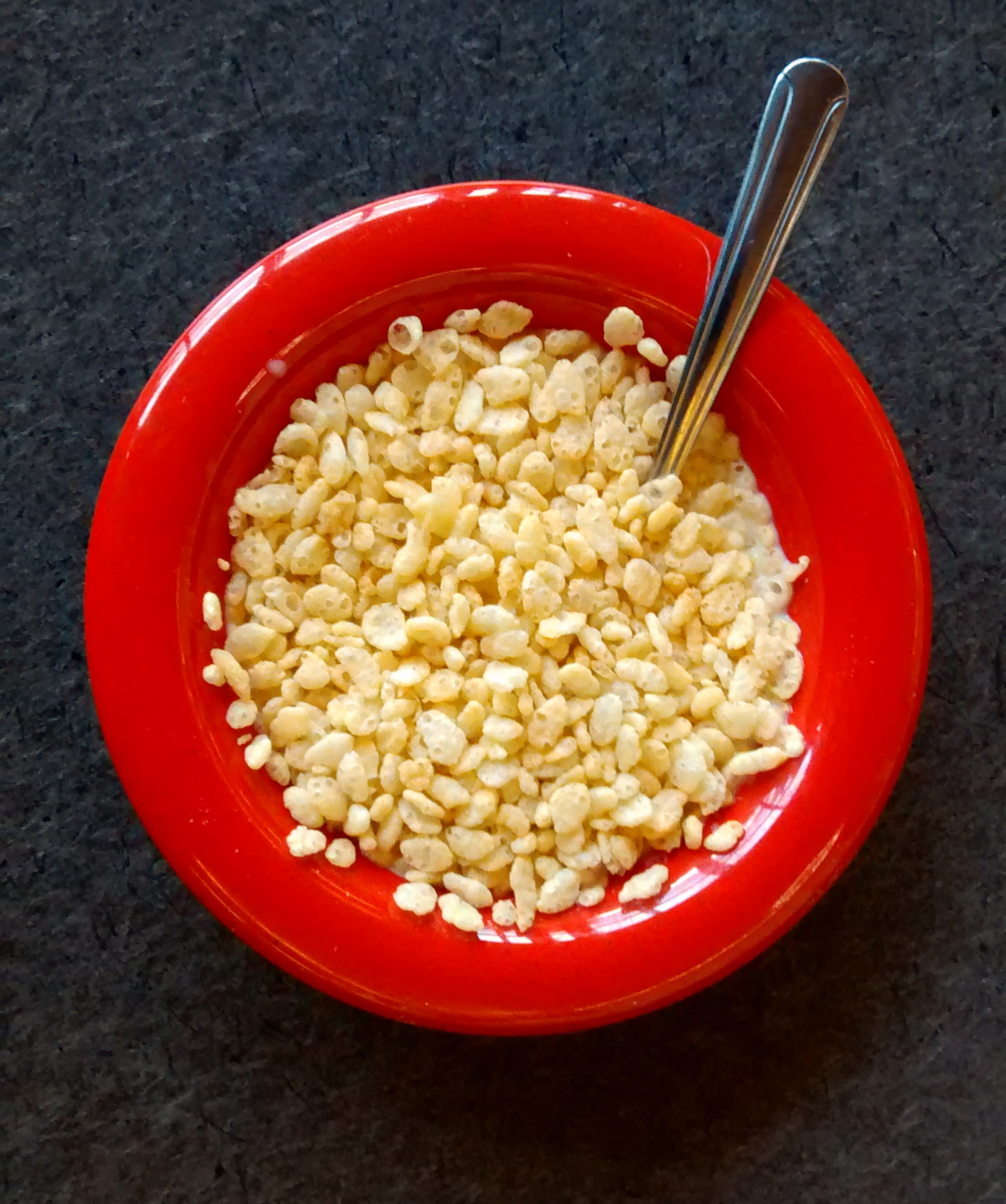
Rice Krispies

- Rainbow Brite Cereal – Ralston (1985)
- Raisin Bran – Kellogg's (1944–present)
- Raisin Bran Crunch – Kellogg's (1999–present)
- Raisin Nut Bran – General Mills
- Raisin Oat Bran – General Mills (1990)
- Raisin Squares – Kellogg's
- Raisin Wheats – Kellogg's – (1980s–present)
- Ready Brek – Weetabix Limited
- Real Medleys Cherry Almond Pecan – Quaker Oats (2014)
- Real Medleys Peach Apple Walnut – Quaker Oats (2014)
- Reese's Puffs – General Mills (May 1994–present)
  - Reese's Puffs Bats (2018)
  - Reese's Puffs Big Puffs (2019)
  - Reese's Puffs Bunnies (2017)
  - Reese's Puffs Hearts (2019) Reese's Peanut Butter Puffs (1994)
- Reptar Crunch – Post (1999)
- Rice Bubbles
- Rice Crisps – Quaker Oats
- Rice Crunchins – General Mills
- Rice Honeys – Nabisco
- Sugar Rice Krinkles – Post (1951–1970s)
- Rice Krispies – Kellogg's – (1927–present)
  - Crispy Rice – Malt-O-Meal
  - Harvest Morn Crisp Rice – Aldi
  - Apple Cinnamon Rice Krispies – Kellogg's (1980s–1990s)
  - Berry Krispies – Kellogg's (2006–2008)
  - Cinnamon Sugar Rice Krispies – Kellogg's
  - Cocoa Krispies – Kellogg's (1958–present)
  - Cocoa Krispies Choconilla – Kellogg's (2007–2009)
  - Cookies & Creme Rice Krispies – Kellogg's (2020)
  - Frosted Krispies – Kellogg's (known as Ricicles in the United Kingdom)
  - Fruity Marshmallow Krispies – Kellogg's (1987-late 1990s)
  - Honey Rice Krispies – Kellogg's – (1996–present) (available only in The UK)
  - Jumbo Krispies – Kellogg's (2009–2011)
  - Marshmallow Rice Krispies – Kellogg's (1982–1993)
  - Rainbow Rice Krispies – Kellogg's (2023)
  - Razzle Dazzle Rice Krispies – Kellogg's (1997–2000)
  - Rice Krispies With Real Strawberries – Kellogg's (2007–2009)
  - Rice Krispies Treats Cereal – Kellogg's (March 1993–present)
  - Rice Krispies with Vanilla Flavour – Kellogg's (available only in Canada)
  - Strawberry Rice Krispies – Kellogg's (Limited time in 1983 and 1997) (Permanent in 2019)
- Richard Petty 43's – General Mills
- Ripple Crisp – General Mills (1993)
- Rip's Big Bowl – Engine 2 Diet
- Rocky Mountain Chocolate Cereal – Kellogg's (2013)
- Rocky Road – General Mills (1986–1987)
- Ryan's World Cereal – Kellogg's (2019)

== S ==
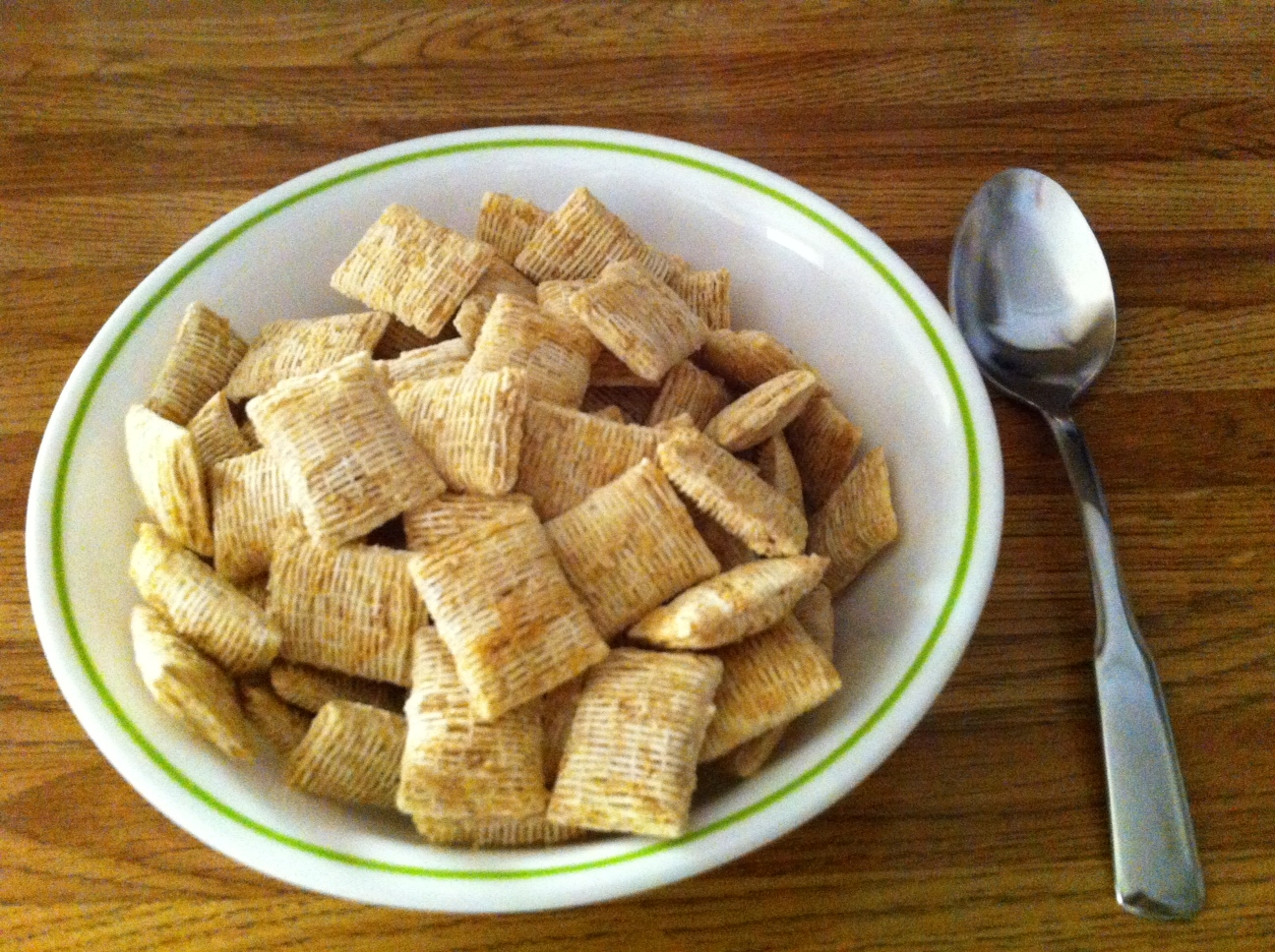
Shredded wheat

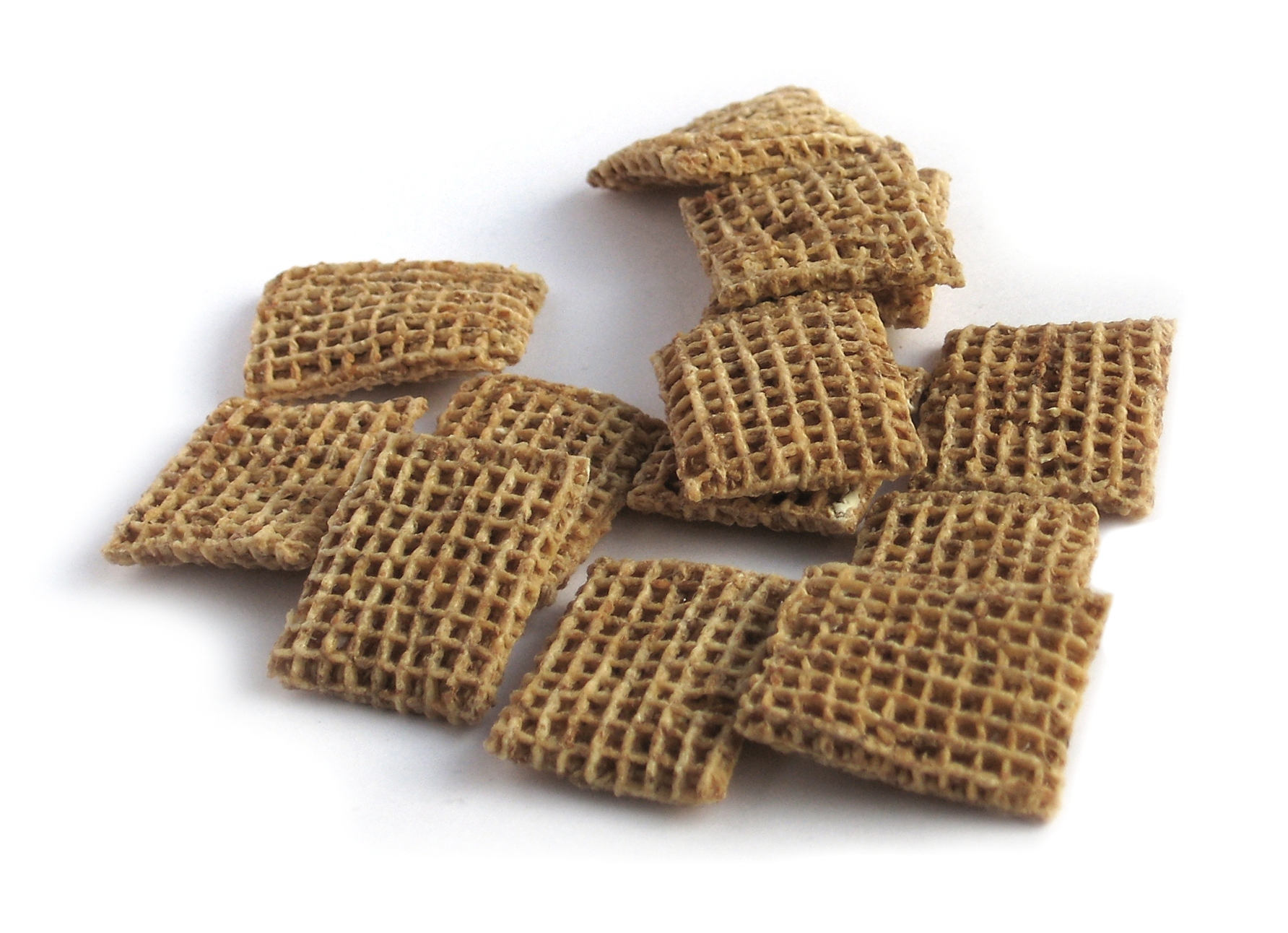
Shreddies

- Scooby-Doo! – Kellogg's (2013)
- Sesame Street Cereal – Post Cereals/General Mills (2013, 2021)
- Shopkins Cutie O's cereal – Kellogg's (2019)
- Shredded Oats – Barbara's Bakery, 1980s
- Shreddd Spoonfuls – Barbara's Bakery, 1980s
- Shredded Wheat
  - Nestlé
  - Post Cereals (originally Nabisco Shredded Wheat) Barbara's Bakery (US), Cereal Partners (UK) – (variants and generic versions sold under various names)
- Shreddies
  - Nestlé
  - Post Foods
- Shrek's (NOT Donkey's) – Shrek-themed cereal made by General Mills
- Shrek 2 Mud & Worms – Nestlé (2004)
- Shrek Cereal – Kellogg's (2007)
- Shrek Ogre O's – MOM Brands (2015)
- Simply Granola Vanilla & Pecan – Quaker Oats (2018)
- Sir Grapefellow – General Mills (1972)
- Slimer! And The Real Ghostbusters Cereal – Ralston (early 1990s)
- Smart Bran
- Smart Start
- S'mores Grahams or S'mores Crunch – General Mills (1980s–1990s)
- Smorz – Kellogg's (2003–?)
- Smurf Berry Crunch – Post Cereals (1983)
- Smurf Magic Berries – Post Cereals (1987–early 1990s)
- Snow Flakes – Nestlé (Eastern Europe, Asia and South America)
- Sonic the Hedgehog – Funko
- Sour Patch Kids – Post Cereals
- Space Jam: A New Legacy Cereal – General Mills (2021)
- Special K – Kellogg's (1955–present)
  - Chocolatey Delight – Kellogg's
  - Cinnamon Pecan – Kellogg's
  - Blueberry – Kellogg's
  - Red Berries – Kellogg's (2001–present)
  - Vanilla Almond – Kellogg's
  - Fruit and Yogurt – Kellogg's
  - Protein Plus – Kellogg's
- Spider-Man – Ralston (1995)
- Spider-Man Cereal – Kellogg's (2002) (2004)
- Spider-Man 3 Cereal – General Mills (2007)
- Spider-Man: Across the Spider-Verse – General Mills (2023)
- SpongeBob SquarePants – Kellogg's (2004–2007)
- SpongeBob SquarePants – General Mills (2014)
- SpongeBob SquarePants Cereal – Kellogg's (2020)
- Sour Patch Kids – Post Cereals (2019)
- Sprinkle Spangles – General Mills (early 1990s)
- Stars – Kellogg's (1960s)
- Star Wars Cereal – Kellogg's (c.2005)
- Star Wars Cereal – General Mills (2015)
- Star Wars Episode II Cereal – General Mills (2002)
- Start – Kellogg's
- Strawberry Blasted Honeycomb – Post Cereals
- Strawberry Squares – Kellogg's (1980s)
- Strawberry Shortcake – General Mills (1980s)
- Strawberry Smiggles – FYE (2018)
- Sugar Cones – General Mills (1967)
- Sugar Crisp – Post Cereals – (now known as Golden Crisp) (1949–present)
- Sugar Jets – General Mills – (name later shortened to Jets) (1950s)
- Sugar Puffs – (now known as Honey Monster Puffs)
- Sugar Puffs Of Wheat – Quaker Oats
- Sugar Smacks – Kellogg's – (now known as Honey Smacks) (1953–present)
- Sugar Smiles – General Mills (1953)
- Sugar Sparkled Twinkles – General Mills (1960–1965)
- Sugar Stars – Kellogg's (1958–1966?)
- Sultana Bran – Kellogg's (Australia and New Zealand)
- Sun Crunchers – General Mills (discontinued) (1990s)
- Sun Flakes – Ralston (discontinued)
- Sunrise – General Mills (1999)
- Superman Cereal – General Mills (2016)
- Superman Stars – Post Cereals
- Super Mario Cereal – Kellogg's
- Sweet Crunch – Quaker Oats
- Sweetened Wheat-fuls – Mom's Best Naturals
- Sweet Puffs – Quaker Oats (1996)
- S.W. Graham – Kellogg's (1980s)

== T ==
- Team Flakes – Nabisco
- Teddy Grahams Breakfast Bears Graham Cereal – Nabisco (1990)
- Teenage Mutant Ninja Turtles Mutant Mayhem Cereal (2023)
- Teenage Mutant Ninja Turtles Cereal – General Mills (2016)
- Teenage Mutant Ninja Turtles Cereal – Ralston (1989–1991)
- Temptations French Vanilla Cereal – Kellogg's (1995)
- Temptations Honey Roasted Pecan Cereal – Kellogg's (1995)
- Tesco High Fibre Bran – see All-Bran
- Thin Mints – Girl Scouts (2017)
- Three Wishes
- Tiger Power – Kellogg's (2004–2006)
- Tigger & Pooh Corn Puffs – General Mills (2008)
- Tim Hortons Timbits Cereal – Post Cereals – (2020)
- Tintin Cereal – Quaker Oats
- Tiny Toast – General Mills (2016)
  - Tiny Toast Blueberry (2016)
  - Tiny Toast Strawberry (2016)
- Tiny Toon Adventures Cereal – Quaker (1990)
- Toasted Cinnamon Squares – Mom's Best Naturals
- Toasted Oatmeal – Quaker Oats (1993)
  - Toasted Oatmeal Brown Sugar (1993)
  - Toasted Honey Nut (1993)
- Toasted Wheat-fuls – Mom's Best Naturals
- Toasties – Post Cereals
- Tony's Cinnamon Krunchers – Kellogg's (2003–2005)
- Tony's Turboz – Kellogg's (2005–present)
- Total – General Mills (1961–present)
  - Total Blueberry Pomegranate (2009)
  - Total Brown Sugar & Oat (1999)
  - Total Cinnamon CrunchTotal Corn
  - Total Cranberry Crunch (2007)
  - Total Honey Clusters (2005)
  - Total Plus Honey Almond Flax (2010)
  - Total Protein (2004)
  - Total Raisin Bran (1989)
  - Total Vanilla Yogurt (2005)
  - Total With Strawberries (2005)
  - Total Whole Grain
- Triple Snack – Kellogg's (ca 1965–1967)
- Triples – General Mills (1993)
- Trix – General Mills (1954–present)
  - Mini Trix – (2015–present)
  - Trix Swirls – (2009)
  - Trolls World Tour Trix – General Mills (2019)
- Turbo Cereal – Post Cereals (2014)
- Twinkles – General Mills (1960s)

== U ==
- Ultima Organic Cereals – Barbara's Bakery
- Uncle Sam Cereal – U.S. Mills (1908–present)
- Undercover Bears – General Mills (1990–1991)
- Urkel-Os – Ralston (1991–1992)
- USA Olympic Crunch – General Mills (1998)
- U.S. Soccer Golden Goals – Quaker Oats (1999)

== V ==
- Vector – Kellogg's (only sold in Canada)
- Veggie O's (popular cereal in Yemen)
- Vita Brits – Uncle Tobys – (1970s–present; only sold in Australia)
- Vive – Kellogg's – (2001–present)

== W-Z ==
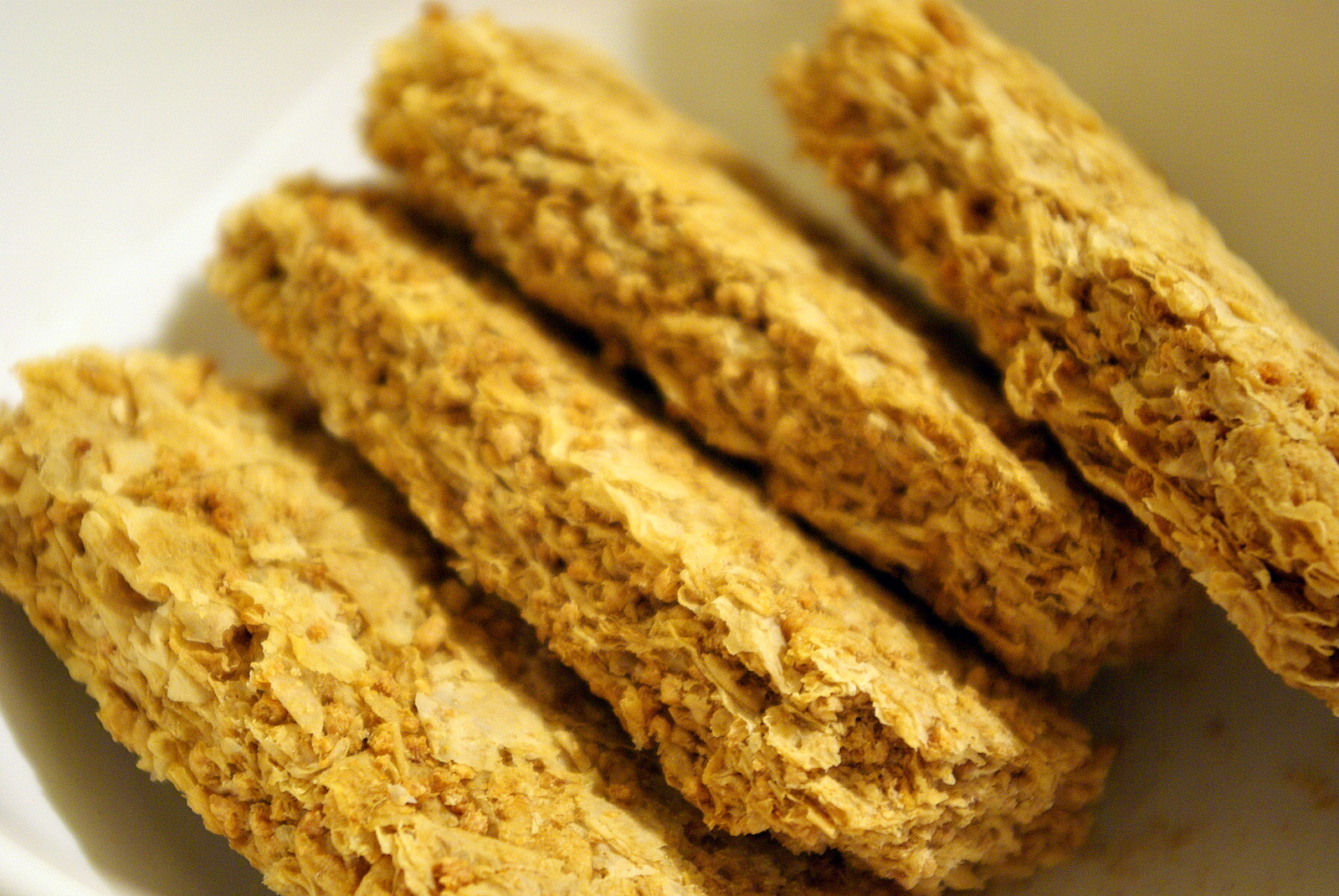
Weet-Bix

- Wackies – General Mills (1965–1967)
- Waffelos – Ralston (late 1970s–early 1980s)
- Waffle Crisp – Post Cereals (1996–present) (sporadic availability)
- Weet-Bix – Sanitarium Health Food Company
- Weetabix – Weetabix Limited – (generic equivalent branded as "whole-wheat biscuits" or similar) – Post Cereals
- Weetabix Minis – Weetabix Limited
- Weetos – Weetabix Limited
- Wendy's Frosty Cereal – Kellogg's (2021)
- Wheat Biscuits – Tesco – see Weetabix
- Wheat Bisks (Harvest Morn) – Aldi – see Weetabix
- Wheat Hearts – General Mills (1960)
- Wheat Honeys Nabisco
- Wheatena
- Wheaties – General Mills – "The Breakfast of Champions" (1924–present)
  - Crispy Wheaties n' Raisins (1995)
  - Frosted Wheaties
  - Honey Frosted Wheaties (1995)
  - Maple Frosted Wheaties (1998)
  - Wheaties Bran With Raisin Flakes
  - Wheaties Energy Crunch (2002)
  - Wheaties Fuel (2009)
- Wheaties Dunk-A-Balls – General Mills (1993)
- Wheaties Quarterback Crunch – General Mills (1994)
- Wheat Shreds (Harvest Morn) – Aldi – see Shredded Wheat
- Wheat Stax – General Mills (1966)
- Whole Hearts – Quaker Oats (2012)
- Wild Animal Crunch – Kellogg's (2008–2009)
- X-treme Fiber N' Berries
- Yog-Active
- Yoga Bar
- Yu-Gi-Oh Cereal – General Mills (2003)
- Zany Fruits – Western Family

== See also ==
- Breakfast cereal
- List of breakfast cereal advertising characters
- List of breakfast foods
- List of breakfast topics
