= Mini Swirlz =

Breakfast cereal made by Kellogg's

Mini Swirlz was a brand of frosted cereal produced by the Kellogg Company. The first flavor, Cinnamon Bun, was introduced in 2005, and was successful enough that two temporary flavors followed, Fudge Ripple and Peanut Butter. The cereal was made mainly with sweetened cornmeal, whole oat grain, and whole wheat grain, with a flavored topping that corresponds to the variety. The pieces in each version are shaped to resemble cinnamon buns. In 2009 Mini Swirlz was discontinued by Kellogg's.

The bite-size pieces are shaped like miniature cinnamon rolls. The pre-sweetened multi-grain cereal is both naturally and artificially flavored.

In early 2010, Mini Swirlz was reintroduced by Kellogg's under the current name of "Cinnabon Cereal" as part of a deal between Kellogg's and Cinnabon, the world's largest producer of cinnamon rolls.

== History ==
Originally introduced in 1991 as Kellogg's Cinnamon Mini Buns. Original ads for the cereal worded it as "Your kids can enjoy the taste of cinnamon buns for breakfast with no added fat or artificial flavors. Just corn and whole grain oats and plenty of the cinnamon crunchy taste they love. New Kellogg's Cinnamon Mini Buns. Little buns that are big on nutrition." The ad was titled, "Eating 70 Cinnamon Buns Can Be Nutritious". Cinnamon Mini Buns was then discontinued by Kellogg's. It was reintroduced as Mini Swirls and again as Kellogg's Cinnabon licensed after Cinnabon World Famous Cinnamon Rolls.

== Nutritional information ==
Mini Swirlz is low in saturated fat and also very low in cholesterol. This cereal is high in zinc and vitamin C, thiamin, riboflavin, niacin, vitamin B_{6}, folate, vitamin B_{12}, iron, and sugar.

== See also ==
- List of breakfast cereals
