= Kaboom (breakfast cereal) =

Discontinued American cereal

A box of Kaboom breakfast cereal.

Kaboom was the name of a vitamin-fortified, circus-themed breakfast cereal introduced by General Mills in 1969, which contained oat cereal bits shaped like smiling clown faces and marshmallow stars--later adding bears, lions, and elephants to the marshmallow shapes in the mid 1980s. Its mascot was a smiling circus clown.

Known primarily as a breakfast cereal of the 1970s and 1980s, Kaboom remained available for sale until 2010 when it was discontinued by General Mills.

== See also ==
- List of defunct consumer brands
- List of breakfast cereals
