= Clackers cereal =

Breakfast cereal made by General Mills

Clackers was the name of a breakfast cereal that the General Mills Corporation manufactured and marketed from 1968 to 1973.

Noted primarily for being promoted through TV commercials in which a box of the cereal would suddenly appear and interrupt some other activity, Clackers was a wheat-based breakfast cereal whose flavor was intended to be similar to that of graham crackers. Each individual piece of the cereal was almost large enough to fit onto a teaspoon, and the shape of a typical piece resembled a small gear with a hole in the center.

Pre-sweetened, promoted as being nutritious, and formulated to be crunchy in milk for longer periods than the mean average for breakfast cereals, Clackers was primarily marketed for those younger than thirteen years of age.

But the cereal was not a major success for General Mills, partially because the commercials, which many adult viewers considered annoying, actually overshadowed the cereal itself. The untimely delivery of toy dune buggies to be used in a promotion also doomed the cereal to failure.

General Mills discontinued production of its Clackers brand in 1973.

== See also ==
- Former brands from General Mills
- List of breakfast cereals
