= Sprinkle Spangles =

Breakfast cereal made by General Mills

Sprinkle Spangles box art

Sprinkle Spangles was a short-lived breakfast cereal by General Mills. It was introduced in 1993, alongside Hidden Treasures. The cereal was of star-shaped pieces covered with multi-colored sprinkles. The commercials claimed that they "Spangled every angle with sprinkles." Sprinkle Spangles were discontinued in 1994.

== Mascot ==
The Sprinkle Spangles mascot was the Sprinkle Genie (voiced by Dom DeLuise). He would often appear in front of children who wished they had sprinkles for breakfast. The Sprinkle Genie's own catchphrase was: "You wish it, I dish it!" The mascot was dropped before the cereal was retired.

== See also ==
- List of defunct consumer brands
- List of breakfast cereals
