= Three Wishes (food) =

Cereal brand

- Logo
- Product type: Breakfast cereal
- Country: United States
- Introduced: 2019
- Website: threewishescereal.com

Three Wishes is a breakfast cereal brand launched by co-founders Ian and Margaret Wishingrad in 2019.

== Description ==
Three Wishes is a brand of breakfast cereals made primarily from chickpea, pea protein, and tapioca. Products are gluten-free and grain-free, and have relatively more protein and less sugar than most cereals. Initial flavors included cinnamon, honey, and unsweetened; cocoa, frosted, and fruity flavors were subsequently added. Sweeteners include monk fruit and organic cane sugar. The cereals are certified non-GMO.

The brand's name refers to Ian and Margaret, as well as their son. Products are packaged in translucent plastic sack liners within pastel cardboard boxes.

== History ==
Frustrated by limited healthy cereal options, spouses Ian and Margaret Wishingrad launched Three Wishes in 2019. The launch followed 2–3 years of new product development at a cost of hundreds of thousands of dollars. During this phase, the couple worked with food scientists and manufacturers to develop the brand's recipes. They tasted more than 100 recipes for consideration. Initially, the Wishingrads financed the project, until additional investors joined, including the co-founders of Rxbar (Peter Rahal and Jared Smith) and a former president of Post Consumer Brands (Steve Van Tassel). Three Wishes is the first cereal company founded by a woman; Margaret is chief executive officer.

The cereals were initially carried by the supermarket chains Sprouts Farmers Market, Wegmans, and Whole Foods Market, approximately 150 natural and organic grocery stores in New York, and Amazon. Approximately 600 stores were stocking Three Wishes cereals by June 2020, including Erewhon and Stew Leonard's locations. With fewer opportunities to offer product samples because of the COVID-19 pandemic, the couple hosted drive-through sampling outside their home in Scarsdale, New York, during a weekend in April 2020. The event implemented social distancing measures and was attended by between 50 and 100 people. When the cocoa flavor launched in June 2020, Three Wishes released a video featuring a taste test and positive testimonials by actors Peter Ostrum, Paris Themmen, and Julie Dawn Cole of the 1971 film Willy Wonka & the Chocolate Factory. Buddy Boeheim's commercial endorsement of Three Wishes in 2021 marked "the first traditional ad campaign featuring a college athlete". The company released a limited edition Buddy Box as part of the campaign.

== Reception ==
In 2019, Tanya Dua of Business Insider taste-tested Three Wishes, comparing three flavors to Cinnamon Toast Crunch, Froot Loops, and Honey Nut Cheerios. She preferred the cinnamon and honey flavors over the unsweetened variety and summarized, "Overall, Three Wishes is a pretty great alternative for those looking to enjoy cereal minus the sugar and carb overload. Its honey and cinnamon flavors don't compromise on taste and are as good as any generic cereal in the market, and its O's are in fact, crunchier." In 2020, Diane von Fürstenberg included Three Wishes in her Amazon collection commemorating International Women's Day.

== See also ==
- List of breakfast cereals
