= Mr. T Cereal =

Breakfast cereal made by Quaker Oats Company

The front box cover of Mr. T Cereal

Mr. T Cereal was a sweetened breakfast cereal manufactured by the Quaker Oats Company from 1984 to 1993. The cereal was prepared with corn and oats as primary ingredients, and it was fortified with iron and B vitamins. The cereal box had a cartoon likeness of Mr. T on the box as the cereal's mascot. The cereal pieces were manufactured in the shape of the letter "T". It has been described as being similar in flavor to Cap'n Crunch cereal, which is also produced by Quaker.

== History and marketing ==
Mr. T Cereal debuted in 1984 and was a popular cereal in the U.S. during the 1980s. The cereal was the first licensed ready-to-eat cereal manufactured and marketed by the Quaker Oats Company.

Elements of marketing and advertising for Mr. T Cereal were geared toward children, per the popularity of Mr. T's media appearances such as in The A-Team and Rocky III. To appeal to children, the cereal was manufactured with a significant amount of sugar. Promotions for the cereal included television advertisements and a stand-up cardboard cutout that was used in supermarkets. Catchphrases for Mr. T Cereal included "Team up with Mr. T, It’s cool" and "I pity the fool who don’t eat my cereal".

A cereal box prize consisted of a packet of Mr. T. stickers, which were packaged inside boxes of the cereal.

Some collectors have collected Mr. T. Cereal, and some collectors have retained unopened boxes of it with the cereal still in the box.

== In popular culture ==
- Mr. T Cereal appeared in the film Pee-wee's Big Adventure, in which Pee-wee Herman held a box of the cereal and poured it over "Mr. Breakfast", a face with fried eggs for eyes and bacon strips for lips on a plate, while imitating Mr. T saying, "I pity the poor fool that don't eat my cereal."
- In season 5, episode 16 of the television show Rules of Engagement, the character Audrey starts a job at a young internet company run by kids. After asking them for something to do, they task her with finding a box of Mr. T cereal for them, which she finds and pays $500 for.
- In the film Boomerang, a 1992 American romantic comedy, the character Tyler Hawkins, played by Martin Lawrence, is shown in his apartment with a box of Mr. T cereal in the kitchen.

== See also ==
- List of breakfast cereals
- Mister T, the TV series whose characters were featured on the cereal box.
