= Yoga Bar =

Indian health food company

- Logo used as of 2026
- Type: Private
- Industry: Health food
- Founded: 4 March 2014; 12 years ago in Bangalore, Karnataka.
- Founder: Anindita Sampath, Sushasini Sampath
- Headquarters: Bangalore, Karnataka, India
- Parent: Sproutlife Foods

Yoga Bar is an Indian health food brand headquartered in Bangalore, Karnataka. The company was founded in 2014 and is known for producing breakfast cereals, protein bars and protein shakes with no added sugar, preservatives and artificial sweeteners.

== History ==
Yoga Bar was founded in 2014 in Bengaluru by siblings Anindita and Suhasini Sampath. The company was originally formed with the objective of introducing healthy snack food alternatives in India.

One of the sisters coined the name "Yoga Bar" while buying a protein bar from Trader Joe's after a yoga session. According to Forbes India, Anindita said "if we made a healthy protein or energy bar like this, I would call it 'Yoga Bar'" which was eventually trademarked. In August 2015, the brand launched its first product "multigrain energy bars" followed by protein bars in the year 2018.

=== Finances ===
Yoga Bar initially raised about $11.6 million in Series A funding from venture capital firms like Elevation Capital and Fireside Ventures. In January 2023, ITC Limited acquired a 39.4% stake in its parent company, Sproutlife Foods, investing approximately $21 million as part of a plan to gradually increase its ownership.

== See also ==
- List of breakfast cereal advertising characters
- List of breakfast cereals
