= Negresco =

Sandwich cookie

- Product type: Sandwich cookie
- Current owner: Nestlé
- Country: Brazil; Switzerland
- Introduced: 1987; 39 years ago
- Markets: Buenos Aires, Argentina

Negresco is a Brazilian sandwich cookie brand created by Nestlé, originally being sold by its now defunct subsidiary Biscoitos São Luiz in 1987. The product was created as a competitor to the Oreo brand, consisting of two chocolate biscuits with a filling usually in vanilla flavor. After the end of São Luiz in 2002, the cookies began to be sold under the Nestlé label. It came onto the Brazilian market and is still only sold there as Biscoitos Recheados (double biscuits) and Biscoitos Wafer (wafer biscuits).

In addition to the sandwich cookies, the brand has also been sold in the form of wafers and ice cream. In 2018, a variation of Chokito chocolate in white chocolate flavor started to be sold inside Nestlé's assorted chocolate box under the name Negresco. In 2023, the brand also began to be sold as a breakfast cereal.

== Flavors ==
Negresco is mostly sold in vanilla flavor for the cream and chocolate for the biscuits. However, there are also other flavors for the cream such as chocolate (being sold under the name Eclipse) and strawberry (under the name Sorvete de Morango, lit. "Strawberry Ice Cream").

== See also ==
- Hydrox
- Passatempo
- Bono (cookie)
