= Marshmallow Mateys =

Breakfast cereal

Nutritional value per 130 g
- Energy: 120 kcal (500 kJ)
- Carbohydrates: 25 g
- Sugars: 13 g
- Dietary fiber: 1 g
- Fat: 1 g
- Protein: 2 g
Vitamins and minerals
Minerals	Quantity %DV^{†}
Sodium	0% 0.25 mg
- ^{†}Percentages estimated using US recommendations for adults, except for potassium, which is estimated based on expert recommendation from the National Academies. Source: Calorie Count

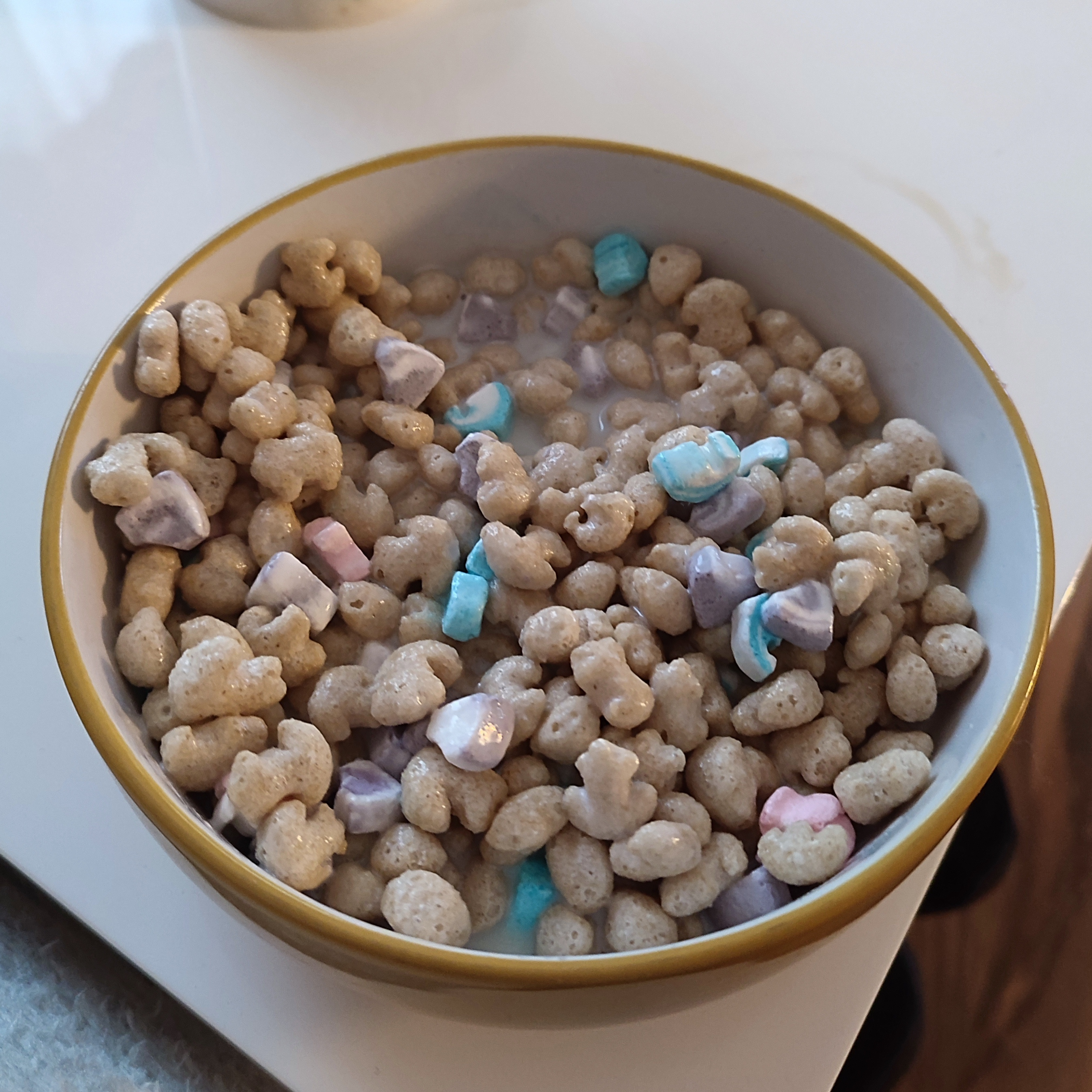
Marshmallow Mateys

Marshmallow Mateys is an American brand of breakfast cereal produced by the MOM Brands food company. The company presented their first line of ready-to-eat cereals in 1965, intending to compete with General Mills' Lucky Charms. Marshmallow Mateys includes marshmallow shapes in various colors.

The oat morsels are formed in the shape of boat anchors; the marshmallow bits may be variously: dolphins (aqua blue & white), doubloons (orange & yellow), gems (red & orange), jewels (purple & white), parrots (yellow), pirate heads in tricorne hats (yellow & red), shovels (orange), starfish (pink & white), tropical fish (green striped).

== See also ==
- List of breakfast cereals
- Lucky Charms
