= Triples (cereal) =

Breakfast cereal made by General Mills

Triples was an American breakfast cereal produced by General Mills in the 1990s that was similar to Rice Krispies. The name was derived from the three grains — corn, wheat and rice — from which the product was composed. A television commercial for Triples involved participants shaking their heads three times to a strange sound (a "triple take"). Consumer surveys reported that it made the milk a perfect level of sweetness while only using 4g of sugar per serving.

== See also ==
- List of defunct consumer brands
- List of breakfast cereals
