= Nintendo Cereal System =

Breakfast cereal

- Product type: Cereal
- Current owner: Ralston Cereals, Nintendo of America
- Country: U.S.
- Introduced: 1988
- Discontinued: 1989
- Markets: U.S.

Nintendo Cereal System was a breakfast cereal which was produced by Ralston Cereals in 1988 and discontinued in 1989. The name of the cereal was based on the Nintendo Entertainment System, and represents two of the most popular video games for the NES at the time: Super Mario Bros. and The Legend of Zelda. Over the years, the cereal has been sold as memorabilia for collectors on online auction sites, at prices exceeding $100 per box. In 2010, a box was sold on eBay for over $200.

== Description ==
The cereal box has two vertical bags inside, each containing a different cereal. One side, called the "Super Mario Bros. Action Series", consists of fruity-flavored characters and items: Marios, Super Mushrooms, Goombas, Koopa Troopas, and Bowsers. The other side, the "Zelda Adventure Series", consists of berry-flavored characters and items: Links, hearts, keys, boomerangs, and shields. Inside the box is a sticker of a Nintendo character, and on the back panel is a set of twelve trading cards called "Nintendo Power Cards". It also presents now-defunct offers to win a Power Pad NES accessory or a Super Mario cereal bowl.
