= Crazy Cow =

Breakfast cereal

Strawberry Crazy Cow box

Crazy Cow was a breakfast cereal produced by General Mills during the 1970s.

== Background ==
The cereal was somewhat of a novelty item in that it had an unusual trait. The round, multi-grain cereal pellets were coated with an excipient of a drink mix. When milk was added, it would dissolve the powdered coating, and the resultant mixture would resemble in sight, smell, and taste, a flavored milk. Crazy Cow came in two flavors, chocolate and strawberry. As the box indicated, these were just flavors; no actual chocolate or strawberries were in the ingredients. The box always contained the disclaimer "artificially flavored" or "chocolate flavored".

The front of the Crazy Cow box usually had a large cartoon cow, smiling cheerfully. On the box for both strawberry and chocolate Crazy Cow, the cow was white with brown spots and wore a hat and a cowbell around her neck. The back of the box often included enticements in the form of images of promotional items included for "free" in the box. One promotional item was Star Wars Trading Cards. These were highly collectible because they were a different variety than those sold in packs. Strawberry Crazy Cow is featured in the music video for Melanie Martinez's song "Tag, You're It".
