= Passatempo =

Brazilian cookie brand

- Product type: Cookies
- Current owner: Nestlé
- Country: Brazil
- Introduced: 1986; 40 years ago (as Divertidos); 1992; 34 years ago (as Passatempo)
- Markets: Brazil

Passatempo is Brazilian cookie brand belonging to Nestlé created in 1986. The brand was originally created under the name Divertidos being sold by the label of the now defunct subsidiary Biscoitos São Luiz and being known for its strong appeal to children.

== Background ==
The brand's first cookies became known for being rectangular milk cookies with prints of cartoon characters such as Snoopy and Disney printed in caramel flavor. Starting in 1992, the brand was reformulated, at first themed with Teenage Mutant Ninja Turtles and later Dinosaurs, changing to its current name and also being sold as sandwich cookies consisting of two square-shaped biscuits filled with chocolate. After the end of São Luiz in 2002, the cookies began to be sold under the Nestlé label.

The brand also has animal mascots, originally starting with a monkey, but later also including an alligator, a zebra, a jaguar, an elephant and a bear. Other products were also created over time such as chocolate chip cookies in 2015 and a breakfast cereal brand in 2022.

== Flavors ==
The sandwich cookie and wafers are known for being typically sold in chocolate and strawberry flavors. In 2017, the doce de leite flavor was launched for the cookie sandwich. In 2019 a limited strawberry flavor based on the Chambinho brand (also owned by Nestlé) was launched. In 2020, a collab took place with other Nestlé brands where the biscuit was sold in the flavors of the Baton and Galak chocolate brands.

== Sponsorship ==
Between 2002 and 2003 Xuxa formed a partnership with the brand, even singing a jingle for the brand for her TV show Xuxa no Mundo da Imaginação.
