= Waffle Crisp =

Breakfast cereal made by Post

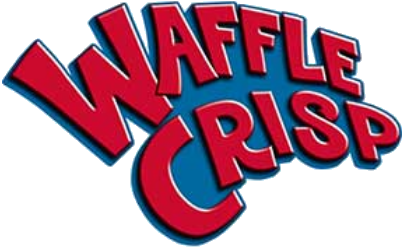

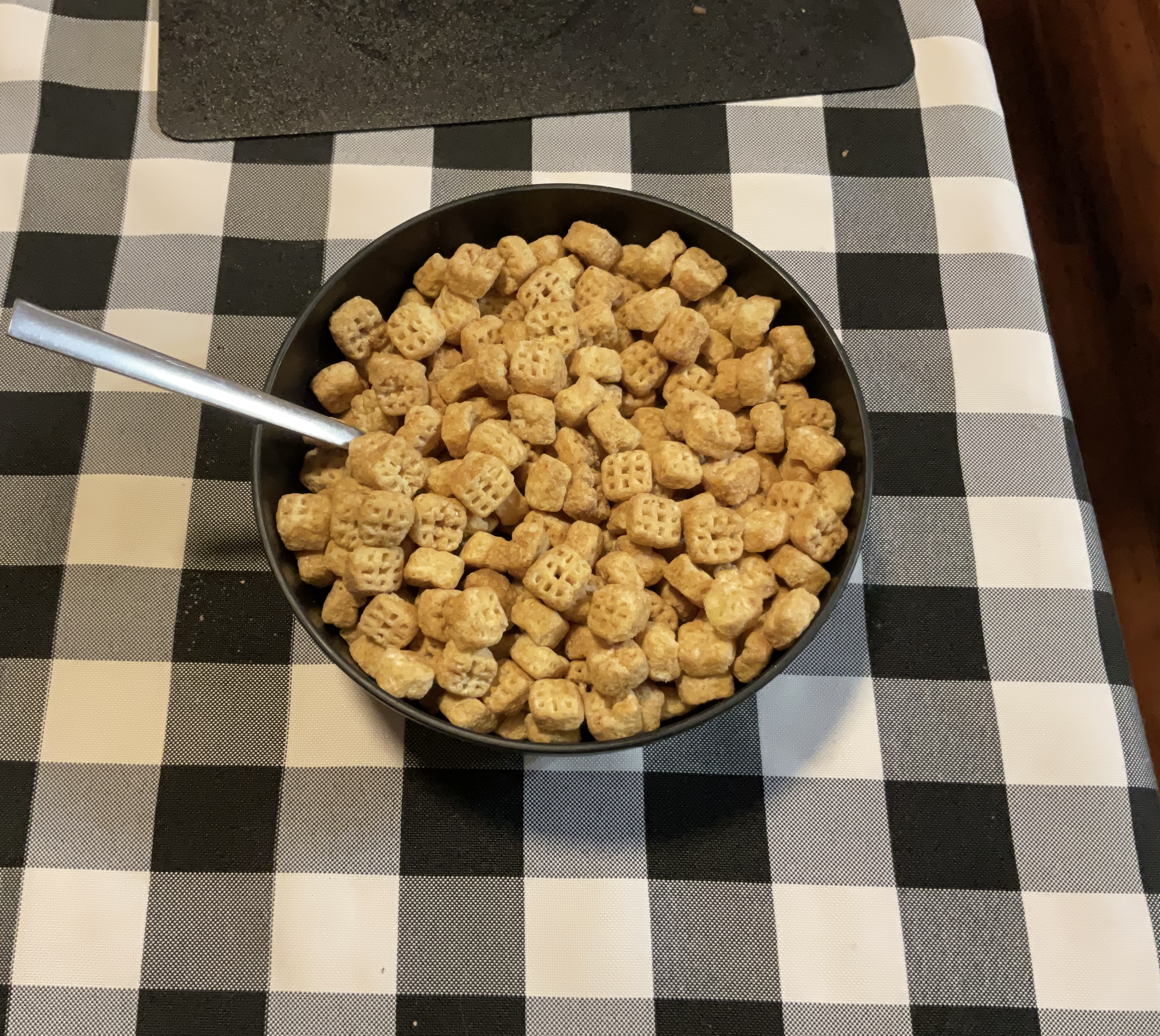
- Product type: Breakfast cereal
- Current owner: Post Consumer Brands
- Introduced: 1996; 30 years ago
- Website: postbrands.com/wafflecrisp

Waffle Crisp is a breakfast cereal made by Post Consumer Brands, which contains maple syrup–flavored corn cereal bits in a waffle shape. It was first launched in 1996. In 2013, Post introduced a lower-priced version of the cereal, "Waffle Crunch", as part of their Good MOREnings line of budget cereals. According to customer service at Post Foods, Waffle Crisp was discontinued in August 2018.

In January 2021, Post Foods decided to return Waffle Crisp to the market. The company’s senior associate brand manager, Joe Woodward, stated that fans of the cereal had expressed great interest in Waffle Crisp even after its discontinuation in 2018. Post Foods helped promote the return of the cereal by sending out samples of the new Waffle Crisp to social media influencers ahead of its relaunch. This action by Post follows as part of their decision to reintroduce some of their old brands, which can be seen with the return of the Oreo O's Cereal.

== Mascots ==
The original Waffle Crisp mascots were a group of elderly women, dubbed "grannies", who purportedly cooked each piece as if it were an actual, miniature-sized waffle. Most of the commercials for Waffle Crisp from the late 1990s featured preteen kids attempting to break into the (surprisingly high-tech) factory to steal the cereal's secret recipe or, at the very least, get a large quantity of Waffle Crisp for themselves (in other words, steal one box of this cereal).

The mascot after that was an anthropomorphic waffle with red tennis shoes dubbed "Waffle Boy". He defends the cereal against a cartoon villain known as "Professor Burnt Toast".
