= CoCo Wheats =

Chocolate breakfast cereal made by Post

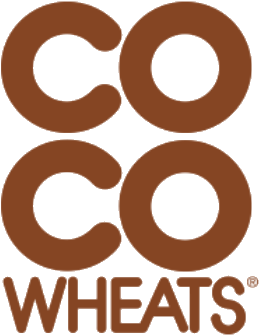
- Product type: Breakfast cereal
- Current owner: Post Holdings
- Produced by: Post Consumer Brands
- Country: U.S.
- Introduced: 1930; 96 years ago
- Previous owners: Little Crow Foods
- Website: postbrands.com/cocowheats

CoCo Wheats is a brand of instant, chocolate flavored breakfast cereal introduced in 1930 and currently owned by Post Holdings. The brand was originally owned by Little Crow Foods, and bought by MOM Brands in 2012. Three years later, MOM Brands was bought by Post Holdings in 2015.

CoCo Wheats is a wheat/farina cereal, flavored with cocoa and contains no sugar. It competes with Chocolate Flavored Malt-O-Meal and Chocolate Flavored Farina.

== Pepper and Perry ==
Cereal mascots Pepper and Perry first surfaced in 1959, appearing in an animated commercial titled "Cuckoo Land." The ad features Mel Blanc voicing Pepper the parrot and a cuckoo bird. Many years later in 1993, the commercial was redone and edited in color with Blanc's original voice-overs intact.

== Reception ==
In 2005, an Indianapolis Monthly writer spent a week eating food produced in Indiana, including CoCo Wheats. He wrote: "I sit down to breakfast humming the jingle for CoCo Wheats, made by Little Crow in Warsaw: CoCo Wheats, Coco Wheats can't be beat, the creamy hot cereal with the cocoa treat. Well, guess what: CoCo Wheats can be beat. They're pasty, only vaguely chocolatey; I don't like them any more than I did when I was eight years old."
