= Spokestoon =

Cartoon character endorsing a product

A spokestoon is an established cartoon character who is hired to endorse a product.

When the United States entered World War II, well-known celebrities already highly placed in American popular culture, such as Donald Duck and Bugs Bunny, joined the war effort, donating their highly visible images for patriotic and informative cartoons. Bambi, loaned by Walt Disney during 1943 to the US Forest Service, was the precursor of the purposely-created Smokey.

Spokestoons have also lent their celebrity status to individual events, such as Pogo for Earth Day in 1970, or The Smurfs to UNICEF in 2005.

Since then, many high-profile cartoon characters have turned their skills to corporate product placement. Though fast food franchises have used gimmicks to tie-in temporarily with current releases of animated features since the 1950s, a few cartoons have become more permanently associated with a product or service offered by corporate culture, similar to that of a mascot, and may be considered genuine spokestoons.

Early recorded usages of the term "spokestoon" include a March 25, 1995, feature in the Portland, Maine Press Herald, noting "Buster Brown, the comic strip character who became the 'spokestoon' for the children's shoe line", and an October 1995 article about the Disney Corporation's use of characters from The Lion King to promote good nutrition in children.

Some examples of spokestoons and the products they are identified with include:

- Dennis the Menace for Dairy Queen until 2002
- Donald Duck for Donald Duck orange juice
- Fred Flintstone and Barney Rubble for Winston cigarettes, Post's Pebbles, and Flintstones vitamins
- Little Lulu for Kleenex
- Bugs Bunny for Tang, Kool-Aid, and Weetabix
- Gumby for Cheerios
- Peanuts characters for the Ford Falcon car, Dolly Madison snacks, and Metropolitan Life Insurance
- Mickey Mouse for Disney Mickey's Magix breakfast cereal
- The Pink Panther for Owens Corning fiberglass thermal insulation, and Sweet'n Low artificial sweetener
- The Road Runner for Charter Communications's Road Runner (now Spectrum) internet service and AutoNation
- Rocky and Bullwinkle characters for Family Fun Center, General Mills, and Taco Bell
- The Simpsons characters for Nestlé's Butterfinger candy bars and Procter & Gamble's Vizir laundry detergent
- The Smurfs characters for Post for Smurfs Berries Crunchy
- Underdog characters for Family Fun Center
- Winnie the Pooh characters for Disney Hunny B's Honey-Graham breakfast cereal
- Yogi Bear characters for Yogi Bear Toastee Tarts
- Huey, Dewey and Louie for Nestle's Trio

== See also ==
- Mascot
