= Caroline Lathrop Post =

American poet (1824–1915)

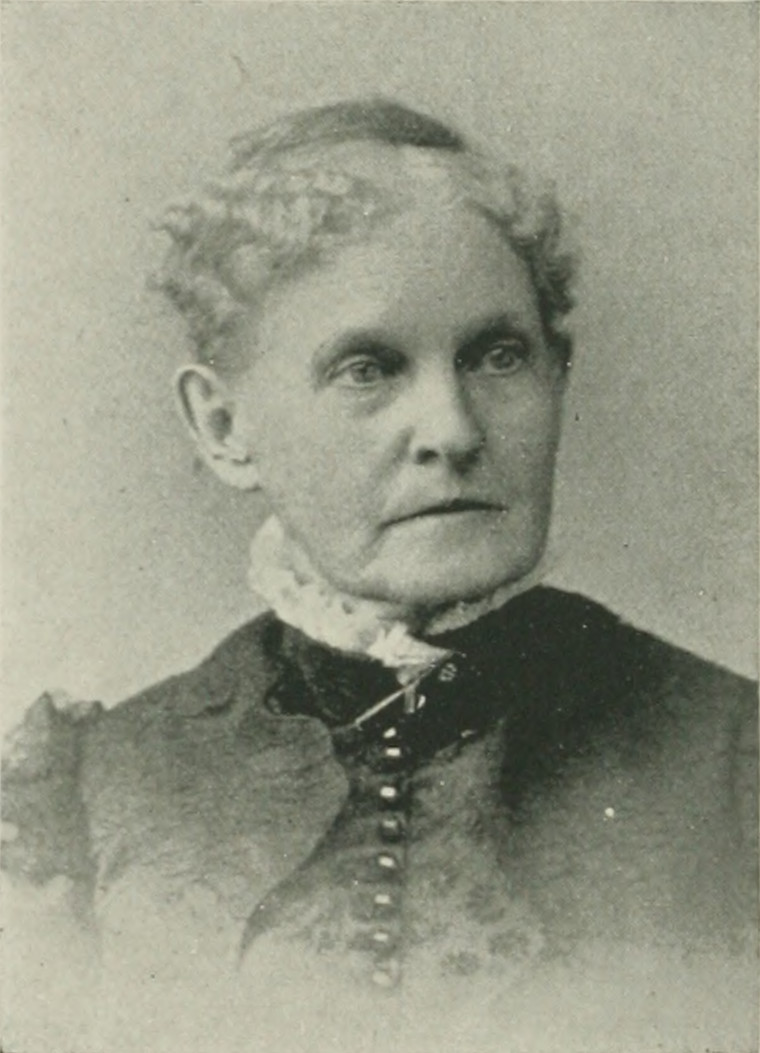
- Born: November 27, 1824 Ashford, Connecticut, US
- Died: May 3, 1915 (aged 90) Springfield, Illinois, US
- Occupation: Poet
- Children: C. W. Post

Caroline Lathrop Post (November 27, 1824 – May 3, 1915) was an American poet. Born Caroline Lathrop in Ashford, Connecticut, her youth included residencies in Hartford and Pittsfield, Massachusetts. She married businessman Charles Rollin Post on October 10, 1853 and moved to Springfield, Illinois. She had been writing poems since childhood. Starting in 1846, her verse appeared in popular magazines of the era, including Sunday Magazine, Advance, Golden Rule, Life and Light, and Floral World. She had three sons: Charles William Post (founder of Post Consumer Brands), Aurelian Atwater Post, and Carroll Lathrop Post. A compilation of her poems was published in 1909 under the title Aunt Carrie's Poems.
