= C.W. Post (cereal) =

Breakfast cereal made by Post

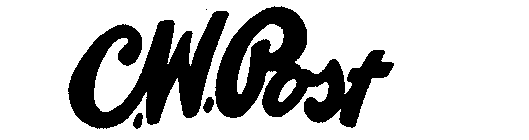
Trademark of C.W. Post cereal

C.W. Post was a granola-type breakfast cereal introduced in the United States by General Foods in July 1975 (49 years ago). It was named after C. W. Post, the founder of the Postum Cereal Company that later became General Foods. The cereal company unit was later sold off and is now Post Foods.

It followed the debuts of other granola cereals by major U.S. cereal manufacturers in the early 1970s: Heartland Natural Cereal, Quaker 100% Natural Granola, Country Morning, and Nature Valley.

The cereal was available with or without raisins, and its sugar content by weight was 27.8% and 24.8%, respectively, in the middle range of popular cereal brands at the time. It was discontinued in 1994 (31 years ago).
