= Pebbles (cereal) =

Breakfast cereal made by Post

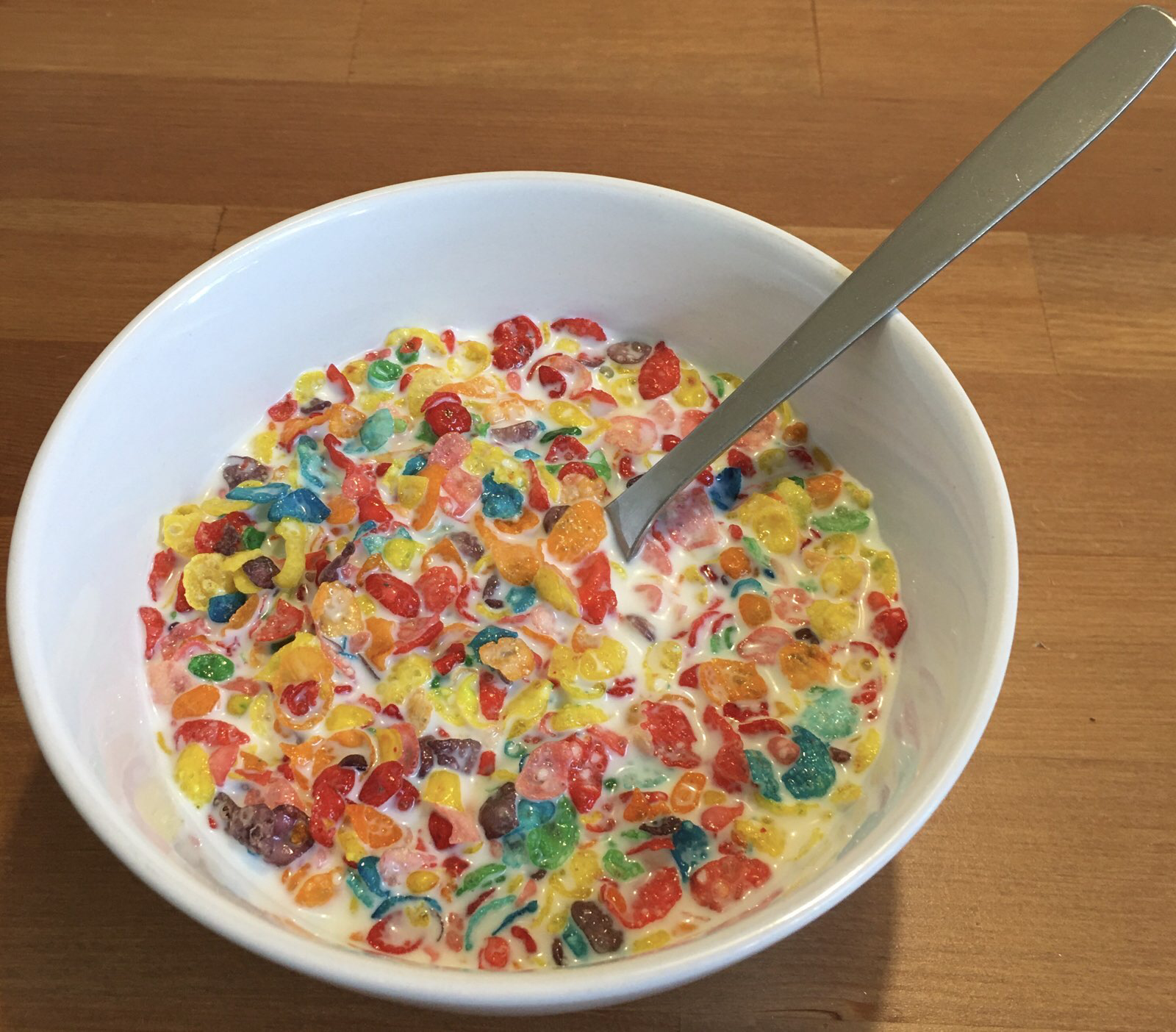
- Fruity Pebbles cereal with milk (Sweetened Rice Cereal, Natural, and Artificial Fruit Flavor)
- Product type: Breakfast cereal
- Current owner: Post Holdings
- Produced by: Post Consumer Brands
- Country: United States
- Introduced: 1969; 57 years ago (West Coast) October 1971; 55 years ago (Nationally)
- Website: pebblescereal.com

Pebbles is a brand of breakfast cereal which was introduced in the United States by Post Consumer Brands on October 20, 1971, featuring characters from the animated series The Flintstones as spokestoons. The product line includes multiple varieties with the two most popular being Cocoa Pebbles and Fruity Pebbles.

Cocoa Pebbles contains chocolate-flavored crisp rice cereal bits, while Fruity Pebbles contains crisp rice cereal bits that come in a variety of fruit flavors. Its sugar content is 9 grams per serving for Fruity Pebbles and 10 grams per serving for Cocoa Pebbles. It is the oldest cereal brand based on characters from a TV series or movie that is still sold.

== Product history ==
Fruity Pebbles and Cocoa Pebbles Cereal were reintroductions of a low market-share Post children's cereal brand called Sugar Rice Krinkles. The Product Group Manager at the time, Larry Weiss, licensed use of The Flintstones for cereal from Hanna-Barbera Productions (now part of Warner Bros. Animation) in an attempt to reinvigorate the children's cereal business for Post Cereals. Prior to that time, character licensing had been used for promotion, but there had never been a brand created around a media character. The brand was marketed despite internal concern it would be a fad and not last more than a year. Fruity Pebbles was introduced on the West Coast in 1969 first under simply the name "Pebbles" and strong consumer demand led to national distribution under the cereal rename of "Fruity Pebbles". In 1970, Cocoa Pebbles was introduced as a second flavor. The brand has been one of the most consistent best sellers ever since.

The original working names for the companion cereals were Flint Chips and Rubble Stones, consistent with the appearance of the cereal and The Flintstones' Stone Age imagery. Frank Corey, Benton & Bowles' creative head for the Post Cereal business, suggested the alternative names Cocoa Pebbles and Fruity Pebbles, which were adopted.

The basic product retained the Sugar Rice Krinkles form, using the existing expander process and Battle Creek production facilities. After many iterations, the Cocoa Pebbles formula was set and has remained largely unchanged over the years. Fruity Pebbles also remained essentially unchanged for decades. In recent years, some additions, and variations have been made to the Fruity Pebbles product formulation. The Canadian version, no longer available, came in the form of pebble-shaped puffs composed of whole wheat, cornflour, and oat flour. Both Fruity Pebbles and Cocoa Pebbles were reformulated in the early-2010s industry-led sugar reduction effort: the original formulation contained 12 grams per 3/4 cup serving, while the 2011 reformulation (still current as of 2024) contains 9 grams sugar per 3/4 cup serving.

=== Product evolution ===
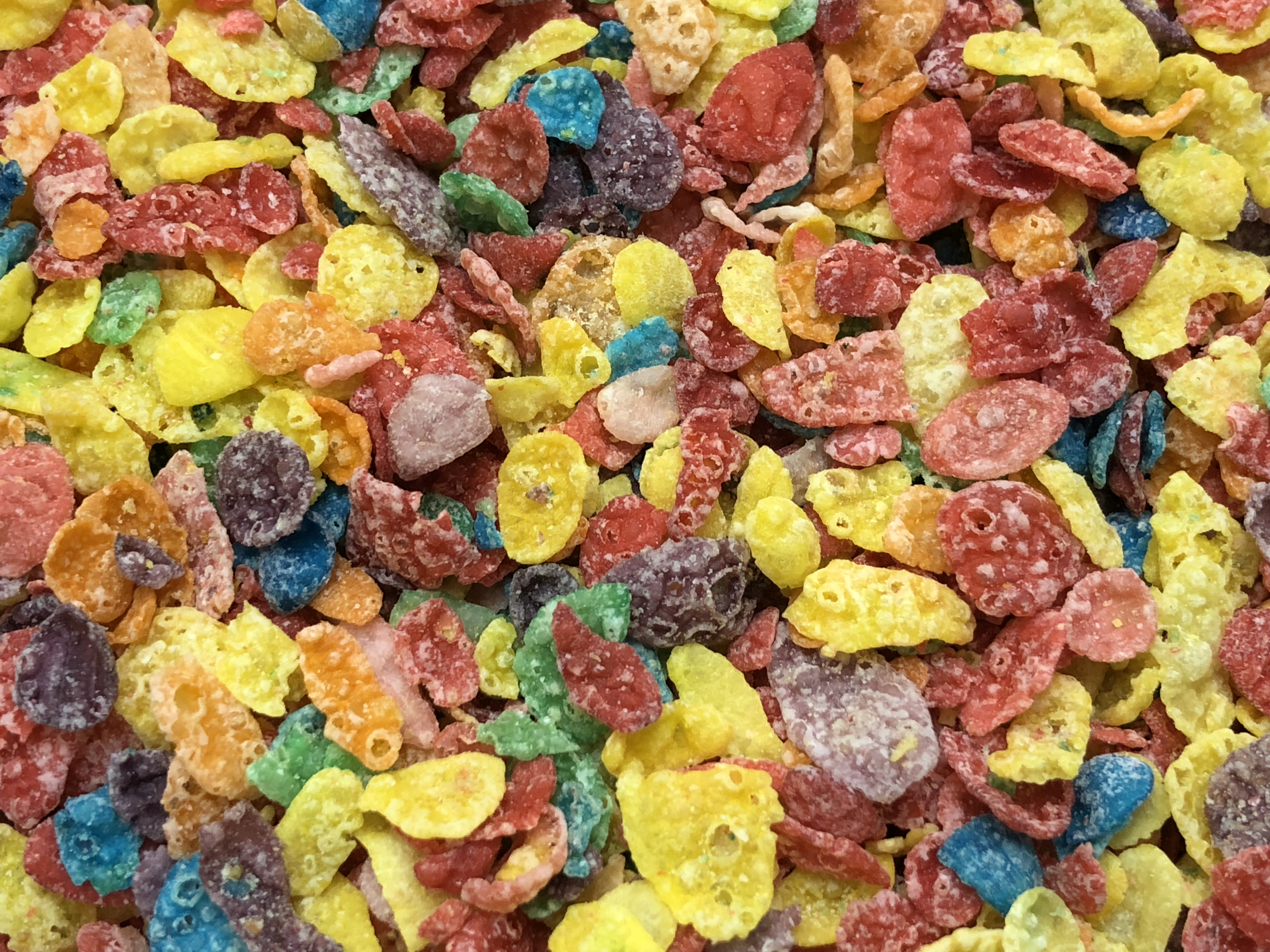
Fruity Pebbles cereal. It started with only three colors, with new variants added through the years

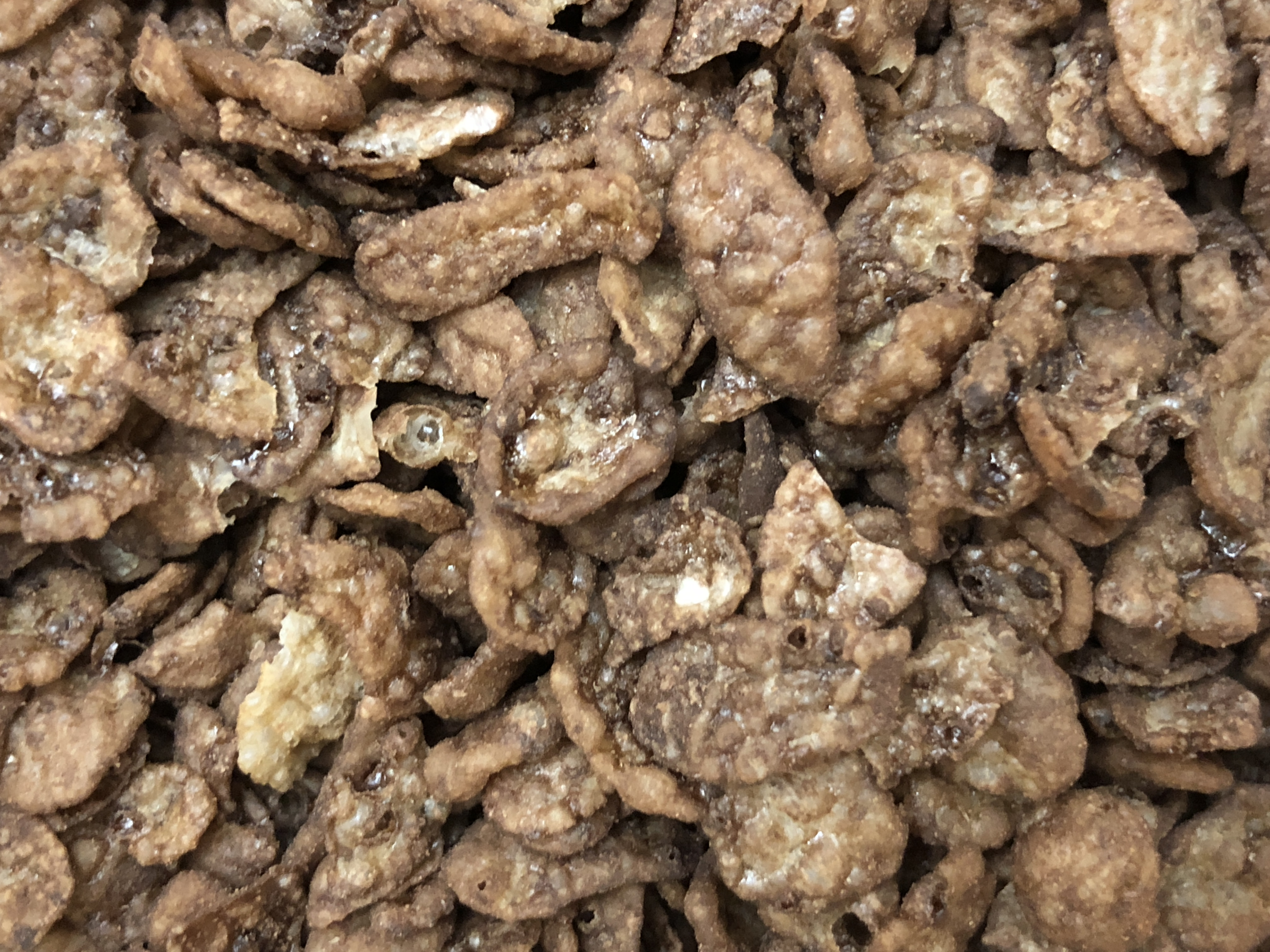
A sample of Cocoa Pebbles, a chocolate variant of Fruity Pebbles

Unlike its sister cereal Cocoa Pebbles, Fruity Pebbles has undergone many formula changes, additions and variants. The cereal started out with three colors—orange, red, and yellow—and natural orange, lemon, and tangerine flavors, but were later flavored in natural orange and artificial lemon and cherry. New colors were added over time: purple in 1985, green in 1987, "Berry Blue" in 1994, "Incrediberry Purple" in 1995, and "Bedrock Berry Pink" in 2005.

Upon Post's acquisition of MOM Brands in 2015 (the former Malt-O-Meal), both the Cocoa and Fruity versions of Pebbles, along with other Post brands, began to be offered in packaging similar to that of Malt-O-Meal's discounted generic line of bagged cereals alongside the traditional box sizes.

Pebbles has since expanded beyond only producing cereal. To celebrate the products' 50th birthday in 2021, Post partnered with the Love Your Melon hat company to produce winter hats and shirts. Post has also licensed other food companies to put out other food products that bear both the Fruity and Cocoa Pebbles flavors including protein powder, white chocolate bars (with the actual cereal mixed in), ice cream (with or without the actual cereal in it), crisps, and Fruity and Cocoa Pebbles Marshmallow Treats (like those made with Rice Krispies), among others.

=== Television commercials ===
The earliest commercials produced by Post's ad agency D'Arcy Masius Benton & Bowles with cooperation from Hanna-Barbera featured the animated duo Fred Flintstone and Barney Rubble (as voiced by Alan Reed and Mel Blanc, respectively) interacting cheerfully with live-action children, eating the cereal around a typical household breakfast table; others showed Fred and Barney enjoying the cereal with their wives around their Bedrock breakfast table or in other locales and situations in Bedrock.

Commercials after about 1978 were entirely animated and would have a typical plot repeated with various differences. Fred eats cereal while Barney would want some as well; to that end, Barney would either disguise himself or distract Fred from his bowl of cereal using various creative and increasingly outrageous means. While Fred was distracted, Barney would eat some Pebbles, but Fred would quickly discover Barney's deception, usually due to Barney's excitement at eating the cereal that would cause his trick to be discovered and/or his disguise falling apart. Angry about having his cereal stolen, he would normally exclaim, "Barney! My Pebbles!" Barney would then chuckle and deliver a comedic line (Such as, "Hate to eat and run".) while running away from the angry Fred, and Fred would give chase. A frequently used tagline for these particular commercials was "They're Yabba-Dabba-Delicious!". Commercials for the cereal aired around the Christmas season feature Barney trying to steal the cereal, however, in the spirit of the holidays, Fred lets Barney have the cereal with him.

In 2009, Pebbles and Bamm-Bamm became more prominent in the commercials, which were produced by legendary animator Rick Reinert. From 2010 to 2012, the commercials for Pebbles cereal were produced by the ad agency Burns Group using stop motion animation with the tagline that the cereal "rocks your whole mouth". The former motif of Barney's cereal theft was removed to focus on the enjoyment of the cereal.

WWE professional wrestler John Cena is an official endorser of Fruity Pebbles as the result of references to the cereal made by Dwayne 'The Rock' Johnson over the course of 2011, where Rock nicknamed Cena (a bowl of) Fruity Pebbles based on his bright shirts.

From 2012 to 2014, Pebbles commercials changed to a scene where Bamm-Bamm and Pebbles perform kung fu and other martial arts.

Since 2014, Pebbles commercials prompt viewers to take a side with either Team Cocoa or Team Fruity, and each individual advertisement includes a different child exemplifying their devoutness to one of the teams. Various celebrities, such as actress Bella Thorne, retired professional basketball player Shaquille O'Neal, and professional soccer player Alex Morgan have been chosen as mascots for either group, as well.

=== Box cover illustrations ===
The box covers for the various Pebbles boxes have been illustrated by commercial artist Seymour Schachter [Seymour Schachter Illustration] since 2004.

=== Lawsuit ===
In May 2010, a controversial commercial of Cocoa Pebbles led to a lawsuit by WWE wrestler Hulk Hogan. In the spring of 2010, a commercial where Barney and Fred face off against a wrestler named Hulk Boulder aired on TV. The commercial ended with Hulk Boulder getting smashed to pieces by Bamm-Bamm after losing the wrestling match. Hulk Hogan sued Post, saying they stole his image to promote Pebbles and that his image had been damaged by the commercials. He used the name Hulk Boulder early in his career until his name was changed to sound more Irish. The suit was settled in September 2010 with a condition of banning the commercial from repeats.

== Varieties ==
Current Flavors
Product	Dates of production	Notes
Fruity Pebbles	1970–present	Fruit-flavored crisp rice cereal bits. Fruity Pebbles and Cocoa Pebbles Cereal were reintroductions of a low share of the market Post children's cereal brand called Sugar Rice Krinkles. Fruity Pebbles contains 9 grams of sugar per serving.
Cocoa Pebbles	1970–present	Chocolate-flavored crisp rice cereal bits. Fruity Pebbles and Cocoa Pebbles Cereal were reintroductions of a low share of the market Post children's cereal brand called Sugar Rice Krinkles. Cocoa Pebbles contains 10 grams of sugar per serving.
Marshmallow Fruity Pebbles	2015–present	Fruity Pebbles with sea creature themed marshmallow bits
Magic Fruity Pebbles	2020–present	They are called magic, because when you put them in milk, the milk turns blue, not pink like might be thought.
Marshmallow Cocoa Pebbles	2022–present	Cocoa Pebbles with chocolate-flavored marshmallow bits
Berry Pebbles	2023–present	Berry Pebbles celebrates women who rock which includes a mixture of blue, red and purple flakes.
Cinnamon Pebbles	2016–2018; 2025–present	Cinnamon flavored rice cereal.

Discontinued Flavors
Product	Dates of production	Notes
Dino Pebbles	1990–1993	Sweetened crisp rice cereal bits with marshmallows. It was promoted by The Flintstones character Dino.
Holiday Fruity Pebbles	1997	A limited edition, holiday themed version of Fruity Pebbles; cereal pieces were green & red.
Bedrock Blizzard	1998–2002	For the 1998 holiday season, the Fruity and Cocoa flavors were altered and renamed "Bedrock Blizzard". The limited-edition cereal had two different flavors: the Fruity flavor had red and green frosting; the Cocoa flavor had white "snow sprinkles". This cereal was replaced by Winter Fruity Pebbles in 2002.
Cinna-Crunch Pebbles	1998–2001	In 1998, Cinna-Crunch Pebbles were introduced. Unlike the other Pebbles which were crisp rice, Cinna-Crunch Pebbles were described as "sweetened oat, corn and wheat cereal baked with a touch of real cinnamon." The box claimed that the cereal had the "Best Cinnamon Sweet Taste In Bedrock" and a "Cinnamon Sweet Taste That Goes Crunch!". Cinna-Crunch Pebbles was introduced as a Limited-Edition cereal and was only available for a limited time. They were discontinued in 2001.
Winter Fruity Pebbles	2002–2005	A winter-themed version of Fruity Pebbles. This replaced the Bedrock Blizzard in 2002.
Marshmallow Mania Pebbles	2005–2007	Debuting in 2005, Marshmallow Mania Pebbles were a combination of Vanilla graham flavored pebbles and marshmallows.
Half Sugar Fruity Pebbles	2005–2007	Reduced-sugar version of Fruity Pebbles. As of 2007, it is out of production
IceBerry Pebbles	2006	In 2006, IceBerry Pebbles were released for a limited time. The pieces were green, red, yellow, and orange. They were described on the box as "sweetened rice cereal with artificial strawberry flavor."
Bamm-Bamm Berry Pebbles	2007–2009	In 2007, Bamm-Bamm Berry Pebbles were introduced, featuring only berry flavors. This was a limited edition, discontinued in 2009.
Dino S'mores Pebbles	2008–2009	In 2008, the Dino S'mores were introduced. These had an object such as a bone, a marshmallow and a chocolate nugget. This was a limited edition, discontinued in 2009.
Cupcake Pebbles	2010	Vanilla cupcake flavoured Pebbles
Pebbles Boulders	2010–2011	In 2010, Pebbles Boulders were introduced, being a limited edition only cereal, featuring two new flavors called "Stone Age Caramel Apple" and "Chocolate Peanut Butter".
Marshmallow Pebbles	2010–2014	In 2010, a new flavor of pebbles was released called Marshmallow Pebbles. The cereal contains rectangular vanilla-graham flavored shaped pebbles and marshmallows. In 2012, the formula for Marshmallow Pebbles changed to the typically shaped Pebbles cereal pieces; the flavor is a sweetened rice cereal rather than vanilla/graham. A new variety that arrived in 2012 features Wilma Flintstone on the box (as part of a "Meet the Flintstones" promotional campaign), and features sweetened orange, red, and white rice cereal pieces with white marshmallows that match the rock necklace that Wilma wears.
Fruity Pebbles Extreme	2013–2014	In 2013, Fruity Pebbles Extreme was introduced, being a modified version of Fruity Pebbles with enhanced flavor and color. It was discontinued in mid-2014.
Sugar Cookies Pebbles	2013, 2014	Sugar Cookies Pebbles was a limited edition flavor that was introduced for the Christmas season in 2013 and again in 2014. It featured Christmas colors.
Summer Berry Pebbles	2014	Summer Berry Pebbles were a mixed berry flavor. Featuring an Independence day theme, the cereal was colored red, white, and blue. It was only available for a limited time.
Candy Corn Pebbles	2014	Candy Corn Pebbles was a limited edition flavor that was introduced for the Halloween season in 2014. It was candy corn flavored and was colored white, yellow and orange similar to candy corn.
Poppin' Pebbles	2014–2016	Poppin' Pebbles were a carbonated version of Fruity Pebbles with an added "bursting berry" flavor. It was sold for a short time between 2014 and 2016.
Ice Cream Pebbles	2015	Rainbow Sherbet flavored crisp rice cereal bits. It was launched in Summer 2015 and contains 9 grams of sugar per serving.
Peanut Butter and Cocoa Pebbles	2018–2020	Cocoa pebbles with lighter brown colored Peanut Butter flavored Pebbles.
Birthday Cake Pebbles	2021	For Pebbles' 50th birthday, they released birthday cake-flavored Pebbles. The box is labeled as a collectors edition and has a shiny coating that has reflective fireworks. On the back of the box is a big cake with a search and find activity. This was a limited edition.
Strawberries & Cream Pebbles	2025–2026	Strawberries & Cream flavored Pebbles
