= Honey Bunches of Oats =

Breakfast cereal made by Post

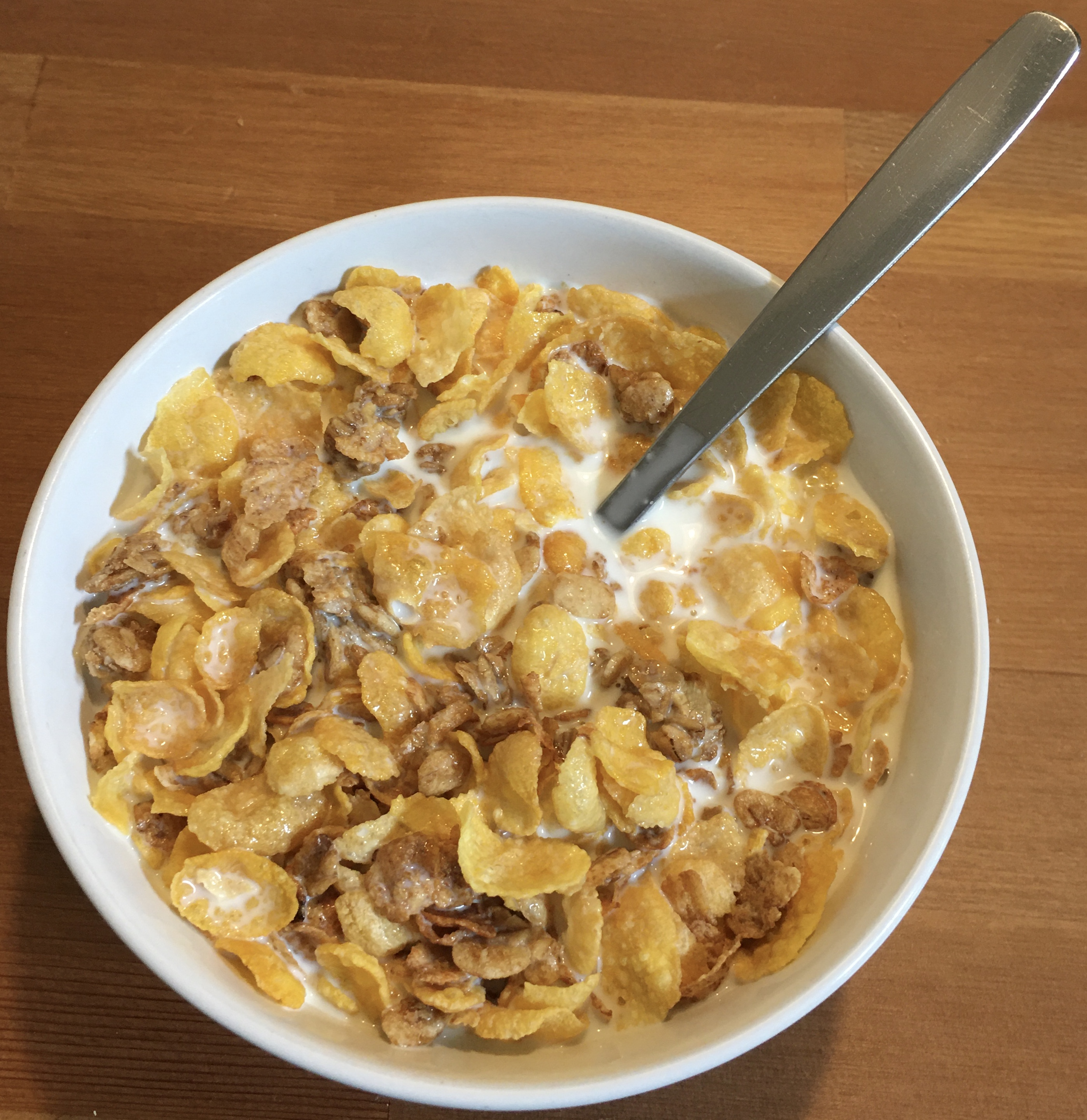
- Post Honey Bunches of Oats – Sweetened Cereal with Oats & Honey, with milk
- Product type: Breakfast cereal
- Current owner: Post Holdings
- Produced by: Post Consumer Brands
- Country: United States
- Introduced: 1989; 37 years ago
- Website: honeybunchesofoats.com

Honey Bunches of Oats is a breakfast cereal owned by Post Holdings and produced by its subsidiary Post Consumer Brands. Created by lifelong Post employee Vernon J. Herzing by mixing several of Post's cereals together and having his daughter taste them, Honey Bunches of Oats was introduced to markets in 1989 after three years of development. The cereal is made up of three kinds of flakes and oat clusters baked with a hint of honey. It is marketed as a source of whole grain. Other varieties have almonds or fruits added into the mix.

== Ingredients ==
The ingredients of the cereal are corn, whole grain wheat, sugar, whole grain rolled oats, rice, canola oil, wheat flour, malted barley flour, corn syrup, salt, molasses, honey, caramel color, barley malt extract, natural and artificial flavor, annatto extract, BHT.

== Varieties ==
The following are current, past, and limited editions:

- Honey Roasted
- With Almonds
- With Peaches
- With Strawberries
- Raisin Medley
- Vanilla Bunches
- Bananas Bunches
- Pecan Bunches
- Apples and Cinnamon Bunches
- Cinnamon Bunches
- Real Chocolate Clusters
- Vanilla Clusters
- Fruit Blends Banana Blueberry
- Fruit Blends Peach Raspberry
- Fruit Blends Apple Strawberry (debuted in January 2013)
- Tropical Blends – Mango Coconut
- Just Bunches Honey Roasted
- Just Bunches Cinnamon
- Just Bunches Caramel
- Greek Honey Crunch (debuted in January 2013)
- Greek Mixed Berry
- Granola – Honey Roasted
- Granola – Raspberry
- Granola – Cinnamon
- Granola – Protein Chocolate
- Granola – French Vanilla Almond
- Granola – Maple Pecan
- Morning Energy – Chocolatey Almond Crunch
- Morning Energy – Cinnamon Crunch
- Chocolate - Gluten Free
- Frosted
- Whole Grain Honey Crunch
- Vanilla
- Honey Roasted Protein
- Protein Cinnamon
- Protein Honey with Almonds

== Vitamins and minerals ==
Honey Bunches of Oats contains iron, niacinamide, vitamin B6, vitamin A palmitate, riboflavin (vitamin B_{2}), thiamine mononitrate (vitamin B1), zinc oxide (source of zinc), folic acid, vitamin B_{12}, vitamin D.

== Slogans ==
- "Good things come in bunches." (slogan at launch)
- "It's what's for breakfast."
- "That's why they call it 'The Best of the Bunch'."
- "It's the cereal you'd make if you made cereal."
- "There's a whole bunch of love."
- "One spoonful is all it takes." (2007–2009)
- "Taste the joy in every spoonful." (2009–present)
- "The magic's in the mix."
