= Alpha-Bits =

Breakfast cereal made by Post

- Product type: Breakfast cereal
- Current owner: Post Holdings
- Produced by: Post Consumer Brands
- Country: United States
- Introduced: 1957; 69 years ago
- Discontinued: October 2021; 5 years ago
- Markets: North America

Alpha-Bits, also known as Frosted Alpha-Bits (styled as AlphA-Bits), was a breakfast cereal made by Post Consumer Brands, which contained frosted alphabet-shaped multi-grain (whole-grain oat and corn flour) cereal bits. Post Cereals also started producing "Marshmallow Alpha-Bits" in 1990.

Alpha-Bits cereal was invented by Thomas M. Quigley who worked for Post Cereals. The cereal was introduced in 1957 and was taken off the market in 2006. However, Alpha-Bits reappeared for sale in January 2008 with a new formulation, touting "0% Sugar!" as a "Limited Edition" cereal. The original recipe was reintroduced later in 2008. The cereal was substantially reformulated in 2017, with the "new and improved" Alpha-Bits having larger shapes than its predecessor. Post Consumer Brands discontinued Alpha-Bits in October 2021. In April 2025, Post announced that due to popular demand, the cereal would return in limited quantities for a limited time in the fall of 2025.

== Varieties ==
"Marshmallow Alpha-Bits", introduced in 1990, contained frosted alphabet-shaped corn cereal bits and marshmallows. This variation of the original Alpha-Bits cereal contained marshmallow vowels: pink A's, yellow E's, purple I's, orange O's, green U's, and, later, blue Y's. Over time, the marshmallows underwent changes such as super-swirls and splits in their colors. Beginning in 2004, Marshmallow Alpha-Bits began disappearing from various markets, before finally being discontinued altogether in 2011.

Marshmallow Alpha-Bits were invented by a small-time entrepreneur named Andrew R. Miller and his cousin Andrew W. Peterson, the latter of whom was a chef at a local restaurant in upstate New York. The pair sold the idea to Post in 1989.

In August 2005, Post Cereals introduced sugar-free Alpha-Bits cereal. In some regions, such as the southeast, Marshmallow Alpha-Bits were removed from shelves by 2000.

== Mascots ==
One of the first advertisers of the cereal was the Ruff and Reddy cartoon show in 1957. Alvin and the Chipmunks were also early pitchers for Alpha-Bits, as Post's then-parent General Foods was the sponsor of The Alvin Show for its sole season beginning in 1961.

Beginning in 1964, the mascot for Alpha-Bits was a postman, possibly a pun on "Post Man" named "Loveable Truly", who was originally voiced by insult comic Jack E. Leonard in a Southern accent. Loveable Truly was also a character in the 1960s cartoon show Linus the Lionhearted on CBS, along with other Post Cereals mascots at the time (including Sugar Bear of Golden Crisp, then called Sugar Crisp).

Since then, mascots have included the "Alpha-Bits Wizard", who appeared near children in kitchens. In Canada, the last Alpha-Bits mascot was "Alpha", a computer who "makes bits". As of 2014, he has been discontinued. The Canadian "Alpha" at first resembled IBM PCs, but recent versions resemble a 2006 iMac.

In the 1980s there was yet another mascot named "Alfie the Alpha-Bits Cereal Wonder Dog". Michael Jackson and The Jackson 5 starred in a series of Alpha-Bits musical TV commercials in 1973. In the 1990s, the mascots are the anthropomorphic cereal bits.

Post Alpha-Bits cereal was also a sponsor of Arthur on PBS. The TV show Super Why! later was the mascot and endorsed this cereal.

== Taglines ==
- ...Tastiest cereal you've ever met—it's just like eating up the alphabet!
- (Alpha-Bits spell energy from A to Z with a capital E. And O G, they simply happen to be a little bit better!) They're A-B-C-Delicious!
- Think smart. Think Alpha-Bits cereal. (Canada only)
- Alpha-Bits, you know you want them, come and have some!
- They're ice-cream-a-licious!
- They're A, B, C, D-licious

== Appearances in the media ==
- In a sponsor spot for the TV sitcom The Andy Griffith Show, Andy advertises Post Alpha-Bits through a swearing-in of deputy Barney Fife before saying his famous trademark line "I appreciate it and goodnight."
- The Jackson 5 appeared in a series of Post Alpha-Bits television ads during the early 1970s.
- An episode of Family Guy features a cutaway gag in which Peter and Brian are sitting at the kitchen table; Peter is eating a bowl of cereal and tells Brian that there's a message in his Alpha-Bits which simply says "Ooooo". Brian looks up from his newspaper and points out they are actually Cheerios.
- In an episode of The Simpsons called "Co-Dependents' Day", there was a scene where Cosmic Wars creator Randall Curtis gives Bart and Lisa a "Jim-Jam" cereal, saying that "It's just Alpha-Bits with extra Js".
- In the 1985 Disney movie One Magic Christmas the cereal box is on the kitchen table.
- This cereal can be seen in the 2003 movie Anger Management.
- In the All Grown Up! episode "Interview With A Campfire", Tommy says "Coming from the man who communicates with aliens through the Alpha-Bits cereal" .
- In the Eric's Depression episode of That '70s Show, Eric is eating Alpha-Bits and as he takes the first bite, he notices the letters spell out "DONNA".
- In season 2 episode 24 of That '70s Show, the words "Post Alpha-Bits" appears stamped on the side of a box that Eric is moving in the office of Price Mart with Red looking on.
- This cereal appears in Diary of a Wimpy Kid, where Greg rushed to breakfast at the beginning of the film. He is seen pouring milk and Alpha-Bits into his mouth.
- This cereal is seen in Pretty Little Liars when Emily pours it in her bowl to discover it's all As, referencing series antagonist "A".
- In season 2 of Everybody Loves Raymond, Frank says to Raymond "I could have eaten a box of Alpha-Bits and crapped a better interview."
- In 2000, a Marshmallow Alpha-Bits commercial featured the main characters from The Land Before Time film series.
- In season 1 episode 9 of Fetch! with Ruff Ruffman
- In the 2013 Rhett & Link single "Epic Rap Battle: Nerd vs Geek", the cereal is mentioned in the line "When I pour my Alpha-Bits, I get nothing but straight A's", referring to the nerd archetype of getting high grades.

== See also ==
- Alphabet pasta
- List of breakfast cereals
