= Little Crow Foods =

American food company

Little Crow Foods was a food company based in Warsaw, Indiana. It was founded in 1903 by W.F. Maish, Sr. as a flour mill. After a major fire in 1919, the company began selling five-pound sacks of pancake mix. CoCo Wheats (hot cereal) were introduced in 1930, Miracle Maize (corn bread and muffin mix) in 1939, Fryin' Magic (seasoning) in 1953, Fastshake (pancake mix in a bottle) in 1985, and Bakin' Miracle (seasoning) in 1989. In 2012, Little Crow announced that they were exiting the food business. They sold off the various products and assets to a combination of MOM Brands and the Gilster-Mary Lee Corp.

== Sources ==
- http://www.littlecrowfoods.com/history/
- https://www.bakingbusiness.com/articles/41584-little-crow-foods-selling-assets-closing-business
