= Oreo O's =

Discontinued breakfast cereal made by Post

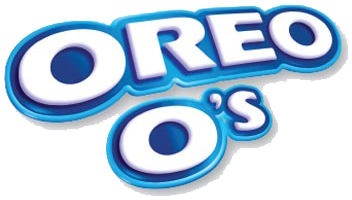

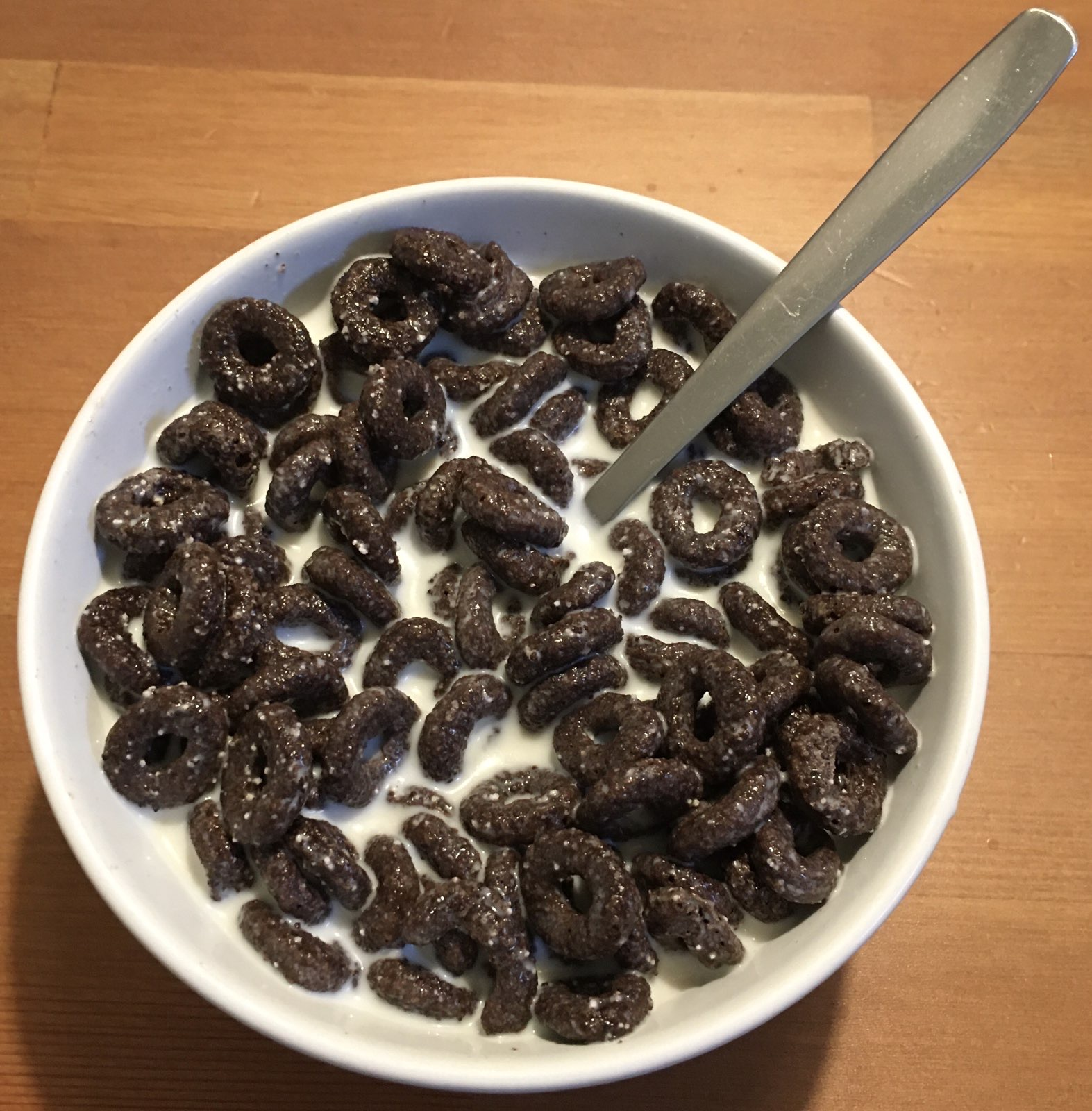
- Post Oreo O's, with milk
- Product type: breakfast cereal
- Current owner: Post Consumer Brands (50%); Kraft Foods Inc. (50%, 1997–2012); Mondelez International (50%, 2012–present)
- Country: Oreo Headquarters, New Jersey
- Introduced: 1997 (1st run, globally); 2003 (1st run, South Korea); 2016 (2nd run, South Korea); 2017 (2nd run, globally)
- Discontinued: 2007 (1st run, globally); 2014 (1st run, South Korea)
- Markets: Worldwide (1997–2007, 2017–2024); South Korea (2003–2014, 2016–present)

Oreo O's
Nutritional value per 1 cup (30 g)
- Energy: 120 kcal (500 kJ)
- Carbohydrates: 21.52
- Sugars: 11.45
- Dietary fiber: 1.49
- Fat: 1.5
- Saturated: 0.43
- Trans: 0
- Protein: 1.28
Vitamins and minerals
Vitamins	Quantity %DV^{†}
Vitamin A equiv.	2% 15 μg
Vitamin C	28% 25 mg
Minerals	Quantity %DV^{†}
Calcium	0% 1 mg
Iron	56% 10 mg
Potassium	2% 49.41 mg
Sodium	6% 128.25 mg
- Other constituents: Quantity
- Cholesterol: 0
- ^{†}Percentages estimated using US recommendations for adults, except for potassium, which is estimated based on expert recommendation from the National Academies.

Oreo O's was a breakfast cereal that consisted of Oreo-flavored O-shaped pieces of cereal. It was conceived of by an Ogilvy & Mather NYC advertising employee and introduced in 1997 by Post Cereals. In 2001 the cereal got a new recipe with real creme filling. A variation of Oreo O's called Extreme Creme Taste Oreo O's contained Oreo filling-flavored marshmallows.

The cereal was launched in 1997 and discontinued in 2007 everywhere other than South Korea. In May 2017, Post Cereals announced that it would restart production of Oreo O's starting June 23 and continue production indefinitely.

== Advertising ==
Several advertisements were run on television for Oreo O's during the late 1990s and early 2000s. The variation Extreme Crème Oreo O's had its own television commercial starring the "Créme Team," a troupe of humanoid marshmallows sporting sunglasses, in 2001. The advertisement promoted the Extreme Crème Oreo O's variation as more chocolatey in taste and creamier.

== Discontinuation ==
The cereal was a joint product from Post Cereals and Kraft Foods(Both Post Cereals and Kraft Foods were owned by the same company), which allowed both companies to share the rights, distribution and profits after 1997. The cereal was successful when it came to sales and parental approval as a suitable breakfast food. In 2007, Kraft Foods sold Post to Ralcorp Holdings, and both companies ceased co-branding, which made the cereal impossible to produce. Kraft Foods owned the copyrights to the name Oreo, yet Post owned the copyrights to the cereal recipe itself. Neither company wished to relinquish either right; therefore forcing the cereal to become discontinued worldwide.

On December 4, 2024, Post announced that Oreo O's will be discontinued again to make way for Oreo Puffs, which would consist of crunchy spheres made of actual Oreo wafers and marshmallow pieces.

== International availability ==
Due to an international loophole with the rights of Oreo O's, they were only produced and available in South Korea, with boxes of the product being available for international purchase on eBay from third-party sellers for well over $10. Korean food manufacturer Dongsuh Foods was established as a joint venture of General Foods and Dongsuh Companies Inc., and had distribution rights to produce Post Foods cereals in Korea. When Kraft Foods acquired General Foods, half of Dongsuh Foods' stock automatically became property of Kraft, thus making Dongsuh Foods the only company with both licenses required to make Post Foods and Oreo O's. The product was recalled in 2014 due to Dongsuh having intentionally diluted E. coli-contaminated product with normal product. In September 2016, Dongsuh resumed selling Oreo O's within South Korea when it spun off from General Foods.

== Experimental off-brand and worldwide return ==
In early 2017, a subsidiary company of Post, Malt-O-Meal Cereals, continued selling the cereal in the United States as a market test. The only differences were that the marshmallows from the 2001 version were not included, the cereal contained artificial flavors and it did not use the Oreo name for licensing reasons. Instead, the cereal was called "Cookies & Cream" and was sold in bags in many Walmart stores. Due to high sales and a marketing deal made by Walmart, Post announced that Nabisco would once again co-brand the cereal. Soon afterward, Oreo O's were re-released with their original 1997 recipe worldwide as a Walmart Exclusive Product, including the United States on June 23. As of 2018, the cereal was available in all grocery stores.

On June 17, 2019, Walmart started selling the cereal with the marshmallows from the 2001 recipe as an exclusive product for a limited time. Instead of being labeled "Extreme Créme Oreo O's", it was labeled "Mega Stuf Oreo O's". The product returned for a limited time in early 2024.

== See also ==
- List of breakfast cereals
