= Post Toasties =

Breakfast cereal made by Post

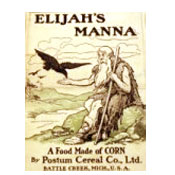
- The Original Design Of Post Toasties (Elijah’s Manna)
- Product type: Breakfast cereal
- Produced by: Post Consumer Brands
- Country: United States
- Introduced: 1904
- Discontinued: August, 2016

Post Toasties was an early American breakfast cereal made by Post Foods. It was named for its originator, C. W. Post, and intended as the Post version of corn flakes.

Post Toasties were originally sold as Elijah's Manna (c. 1904) until criticism from religious groups (and consequent loss of sales) led to a change of name in 1908.

In the 1930s, Post paid Walt Disney $1.5 million in the first year to design cartoon animals to illustrate its boxes of Post Toasties.

As of August 2016, Post Toasties are listed as discontinued on the PostFoods web site. This includes flavors Frosted Flakes, O's, and Corn Flakes.

The term "Post Toasties" was also sardonically used in Texas to refer to the approximately 1,900 employees of the Houston Post, a newspaper in Houston, Texas, who were laid off when that paper ceased publication in 1995.
