= Honeycomb (cereal) =

Breakfast cereal made by Post

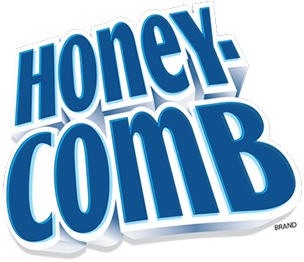

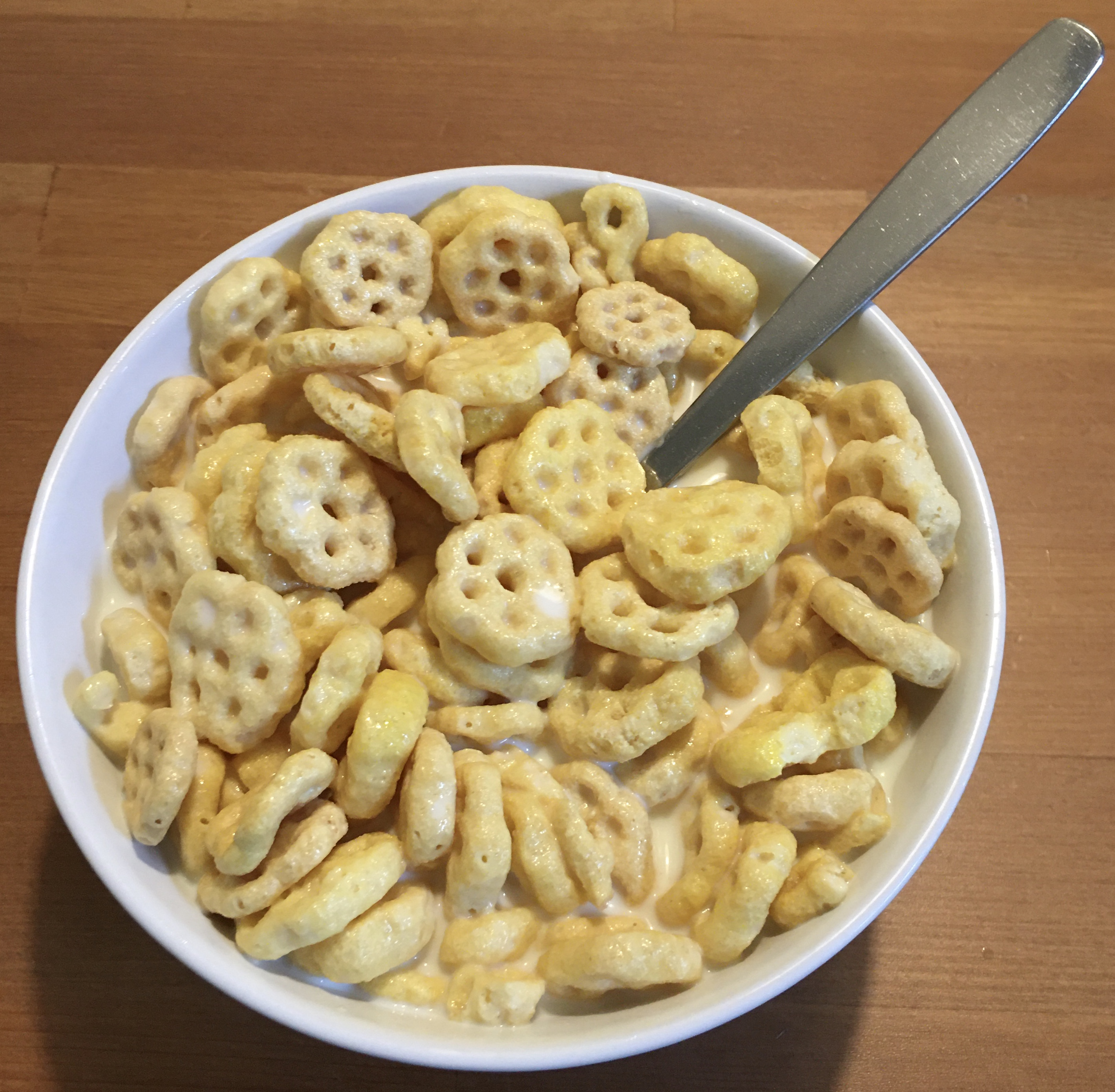
- Post Honey-Comb – Sweetened Corn & Oat Cereal, with milk
- Product type: Breakfast cereal
- Current owner: Post Holdings
- Produced by: Post Consumer Brands
- Country: U.S.
- Introduced: 1965; 61 years ago
- Website: post.com/honeycomb

Honeycomb is a breakfast cereal first released in 1965, owned by Post Holdings. It consists of honey-flavored corn cereal bits in a honeycomb shape.

== Versions ==
At the end of 2006, Post changed the formula for Honeycomb to make it healthier. This change, although tested by Post beforehand to positive reviews, received mainly negative reviews from consumers.

Following this public response, in March 2007, Kraft Foods (then-owner of Post Cereals) introduced a new "Improved Taste" version of the cereal that the company claimed would improve "the cereal's taste, texture and appearance while incorporating key nutritional benefits to the product."

Four flavor variations have been marketed: Strawberry Blasted Honeycomb, Chocolate Honeycomb, Cinna-Graham Honeycomb, and Strawberry Honeycomb.

=== Ingredients ===
The product's ingredients are listed as:

corn flour, sugar, whole grain oat flour, modified cornstarch, corn syrup, honey, salt, turmeric (color), and wheat starch.

Ferric Orthophosphate (source of iron), Niacinamide (Vitamin B3), Zinc Oxide (source of zinc), Thiamin Mononitrate (Vitamin B1), Calcium Pantothenate (a B-Vitamin), Pyridoxine Hydrochloride (Vitamin B6), Folic Acid.

The product's ingredients prior to May 2017 are listed as:

corn flour and bran blend (corn flour, whole grain corn flour, corn bran), sugar, whole grain oat flour, honey, salt, yellow 5, and BHT added to packaging material to preserve product freshness.

Vitamins & minerals: niacinamide (B vitamin), reduced iron, zinc oxide (source of zinc), Vitamin B_{6}, Vitamin A palmitate, riboflavin (Vitamin B_{2}), thiamin mononitrate (Vitamin B_{1}), folic acid (B vitamin), Vitamin B_{12}, Vitamin D

When Bran Blend, defined as whole grain corn flour and corn bran, was included in the ingredient list, the fiber content was tripled (from 1g to 3g per serving). This put the cereal in Kraft's Sensible Solution program.

== Advertising and Marketing ==
Originally, an animated cowboy named The Honeycomb Kid was the cereal's mascot. The cereal's jingle was borrowed from the song "Honeycomb", a 1957 hit for Jimmie Rodgers.

=== Honeycomb Hideout ===
During the 1970s and 1980s, television commercials featured visitors to a children's clubhouse called the Honeycomb Hideout in which the visitor arrives, initially hostile, and exclaims a need for a "big" cereal. The kids introduce the visitor to the cereal, winning over the visitor, and then they examine the size of the cereal bits with a tape measure and sing the jingle:

"Honeycomb's big...yeah yeah yeah!
It's not small...no no no!
Honeycomb's got...a big big bite (later a "big honey taste")!
Big big taste (later "crunch") in a big big bite!"

During the 1980s, the cereal offered the Honeycomb Hideout Club for children, distributing badges, membership cards and clubhouse toy incentives on specially marked box tops.

The jingle was spoofed on the Futurama episode entitled "The Sting" in 2003.

=== Honeycomb Kid ===
Honeycomb Kid sought what he called "The Honeycomb Secret". Honeycomb Kid had learned from his prior adventures that the secret consisted of three separate parts: the first was the crunch; the second was the shape; however, the third and most important answer had always eluded him. In the last installment of his first commercial appearances, Honeycomb Kid discovers that the third component of the Honeycomb secret is the taste.

Another set of Honeycomb Kid commercials were made in the 1980s in which a child athlete finished practicing, then came up to a table with Honeycomb cereal, exclaimed it was his or her favorite cereal, to where the older people at the table would somewhat mock the "little kid" or "little guy" for wanting "big Honeycomb", to which the kid would respond, "Little kid (guy)?! Watch this!" The kid would then show off his or her skills to them, thoroughly impressing them (saying "Big stuff!" and "Honeycomb kid!" as they watched) and being accepted by them ("I didn't know you were a Honeycomb kid!"). The commercial ends with the kid happily eating a bowl of Honeycombs.

=== Crazy Craving ===
In 1995, a mascot, Crazy Craving was introduced as a wild-haired, wide-eyed character who craves Honeycomb cereal and whom children in the commercials transform into. Its catch-phrase was "Me Want Honeycomb!"

=== Bernard, the Bee Boy ===
Another commercial introduces Bernard, a boy raised by bees. In the advertisement, he is found by human people and they attempt to socialize with him. Although he had clearly been a feral child, he apparently cannot argue the fact that he is a 'bee' not a 'boy,' and he enjoys Honeycomb. In a later commercial, a man gives a safari-like tour for the bee boy, luring him with Honeycomb. In a commercial released in 2010, a second bee boy was introduced played by Canadian actor Joel Cox.

== Mini scale models and license plates ==
In 1969, one of Post Cereal's most profitable promotions was launched for the twentieth time in as many years. Free scale models of four different 1969 Mercury automobiles were packed one to a box of Honeycomb. Offered in six authentic '69 Mercury colors, the entire set included 24 different cars. Because these models were not offered by mail, one had to purchase a lot of Honeycomb to acquire the entire collection.

The Mercurys were followed by a series of generic racing cars (1970), an offering of marble-powered dune buggies (1973), and a small model of the Flintmobile from the television series "The Flintstones" (1975). By then, Honeycomb had become the source for automotive toys from Post.

Miniature license plates had been a cereal premium mainstay since 1953, and Honeycomb continued the tradition into the 1970s and 1980s with their free "in pack" mini-license plate promotion. One miniature state license plate was free inside each box, with the ability to order the whole set of 50 plates by mail for a few dollars. One year, there was a contest where there was a plate that said "LUCKY" and the recipient of that plate won a BMX bike. (This commercial was noteworthy for showing a girl [who won the bike] on a BMX bike, which was a rare sight back then.)
