= Post Consumer Brands =

American consumer foods brand

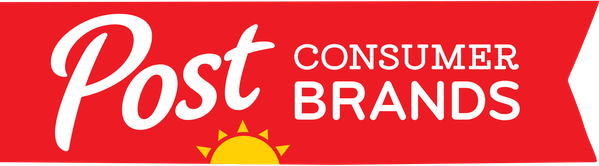
- Formerly: Postum Cereal Company (1895–1929); General Foods (1929–1990); Kraft (1990–2007); Post Cereals (2007–2015)
- Type: Subsidiary
- Industry: Food processing
- Founded: 1895; 131 years ago in Battle Creek, Michigan
- Founder: C. W. Post
- Headquarters: Lakeville, Minnesota, US
- Area served: Worldwide
- Products: Breakfast cereals, granola, pet food, peanut butter
- Brands: List: Bran Flakes; Grape-Nuts; Honey Bunches of Oats; Honeycomb; Kibbles N' Bits; Malt-O-Meal; Oreo O's; Pebbles; Peter Pan Peanut Butter; Puffins cereal; Rachael Ray Nutrish; Waffle Crisp
- Parent: Post Holdings
- Website: www.postconsumerbrands.com

Post Consumer Brands, LLC (previously Post Cereals and Postum Cereals), also known as Post, is an American consumer packaged goods food manufacturer headquartered in Lakeville, Minnesota.

The company, founded in 1895 by C. W. Post, owns a large portfolio of cereal brands that include Bran Flakes, Honey Bunches of Oats, Golden Crisp, Grape-Nuts, Honeycomb, Pebbles, and Waffle Crisp, among others. The company also produces several pet food brands, including Rachael Ray Nutrish, Kibbles 'n Bits, and 9Lives, and markets Peter Pan Peanut Butter.

== History ==
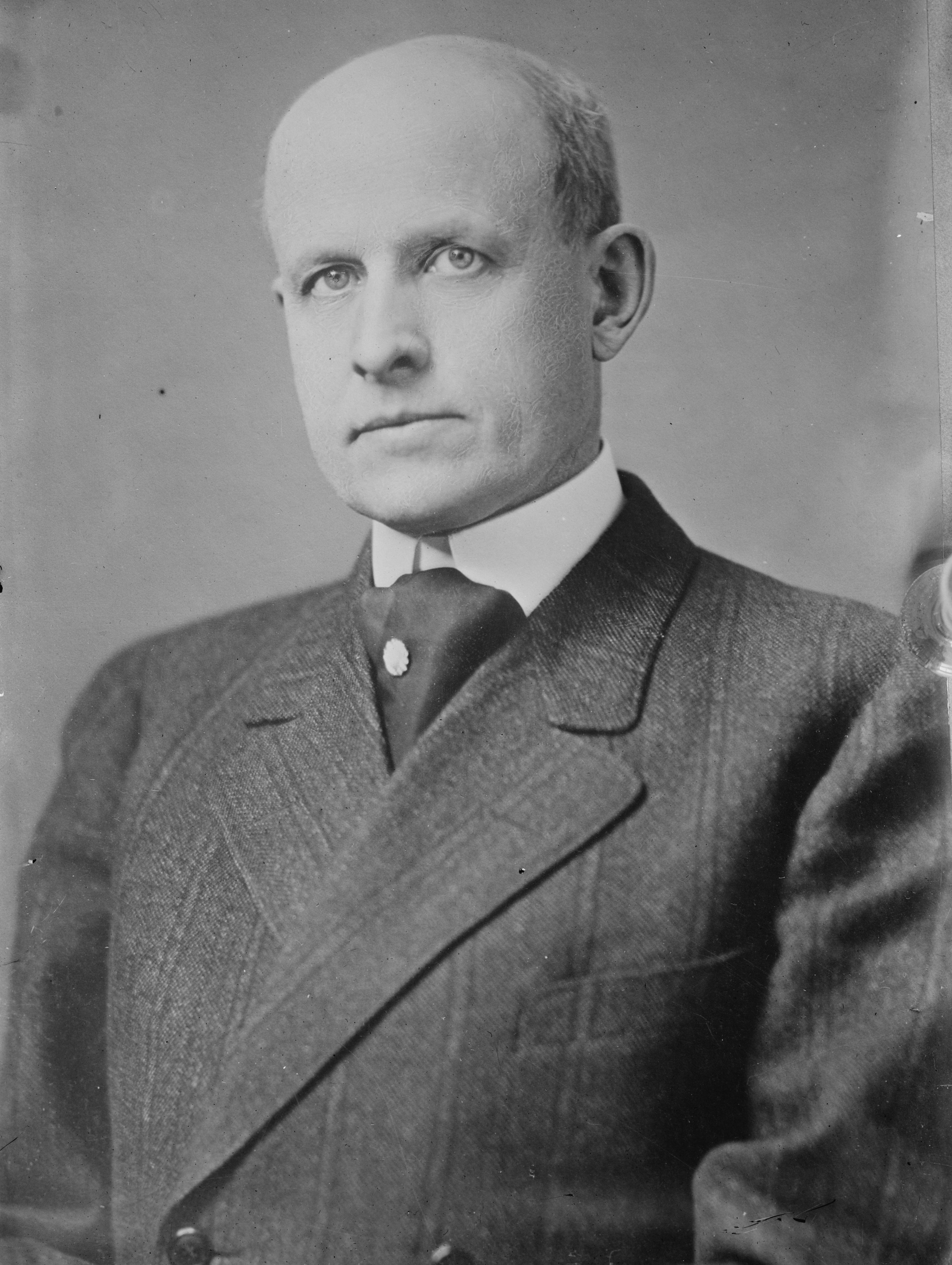
C.W. Post, founder

C. W. Post established his company in Battle Creek, Michigan, having lived there since 1891, when he was a patient at a holistic sanitarium operated by Dr. John Harvey Kellogg. Dr. Kellogg, with his brother W. K. Kellogg, had developed a dry corn flake cereal that was part of their patients' diet. Post's first product, introduced in 1895, was not a cereal, however, but a roasted, cereal-based beverage, Postum. Having developed an aversion to coffee during his time in the sanitarium, Post positioned Postum as a healthy alternative. Its advertising slogan, which he coined himself, was, "There's a Reason." Postum's main ingredients were naturally caffeine-free wheat grain, bran, and molasses. Initially, Postum had to be brewed like coffee, but in 1911, Post introduced a powdered, instant formulation. This version of the product was manufactured in Battle Creek until it was discontinued in 2007. As of January 2013, Eliza's Quest Food had succeeded in returning Postum to many grocery stores across the United States and Canada.

In 1897, Post introduced his first dry cereal, a crunchy blend of wheat and barley, which he called Grape Nuts. His first corn-flake product was introduced as "Elijah's Manna" in 1904. Owing to consumer resistance to the (inaccurate) biblical reference that was so great that even Great Britain flatly refused to register the name as a trademark, it was renamed Post Toasties in 1907.

C. W. Post was a businessman who emphasised advertising and marketing as central to business success. Within ten years of its incorporation, the Postum Cereal Company had over $10 million in capital and spent $400,000 annually on advertising, notable sums for the period.

Employees were among the highest-paid in the industry, and working conditions at the factory were regarded as exemplary. Post also developed a factory town, selling homes to workers at favourable rates.

Postum Cereal Company lost its founder in 1914. C.W. Post underwent an apparently successful appendectomy at the Mayo Clinic, but shortly after returning home to recuperate, he died of a self-inflicted gunshot wound. Post had for years suffered from bouts of illness and depression. While his death was without warning, his company was not left rudderless. His daughter, Marjorie Merriweather Post, had been raised in the business and was familiar with virtually every aspect of its operations. She assumed control of the now $20-million Postum Company and managed its affairs for the next eight years. While she did not oversee major product innovations, she did have a good feel for business and for promoting talented managers. In addition, her second marriage, in 1920, was to Edward F. Hutton, the founder of a brokerage firm on Wall Street.

Gross revenues in 1921 were $17.75 million. In 1922, Hutton took the newly incorporated Postum Cereal Company public by issuing 200,000 common shares. The 1920s was a period in which common stock was still considered highly speculative, and consequently the newly issued shares carried a dividend at the rate of $5.00 per year.

Revenues in 1922 were essentially the same as in 1921, but in 1923, they were $22.25 million and a stock split, in the form of a 100% stock dividend, increased the authorized shares to 400,000. These shares also earned a $3.00 annual cash dividend, representing a 20% increase over the presplit rate. In 1925, with revenues now at $27.4 million, the stock was split once again and the dividend was increased to $4.00 per new share.

=== Major acquisitions ===
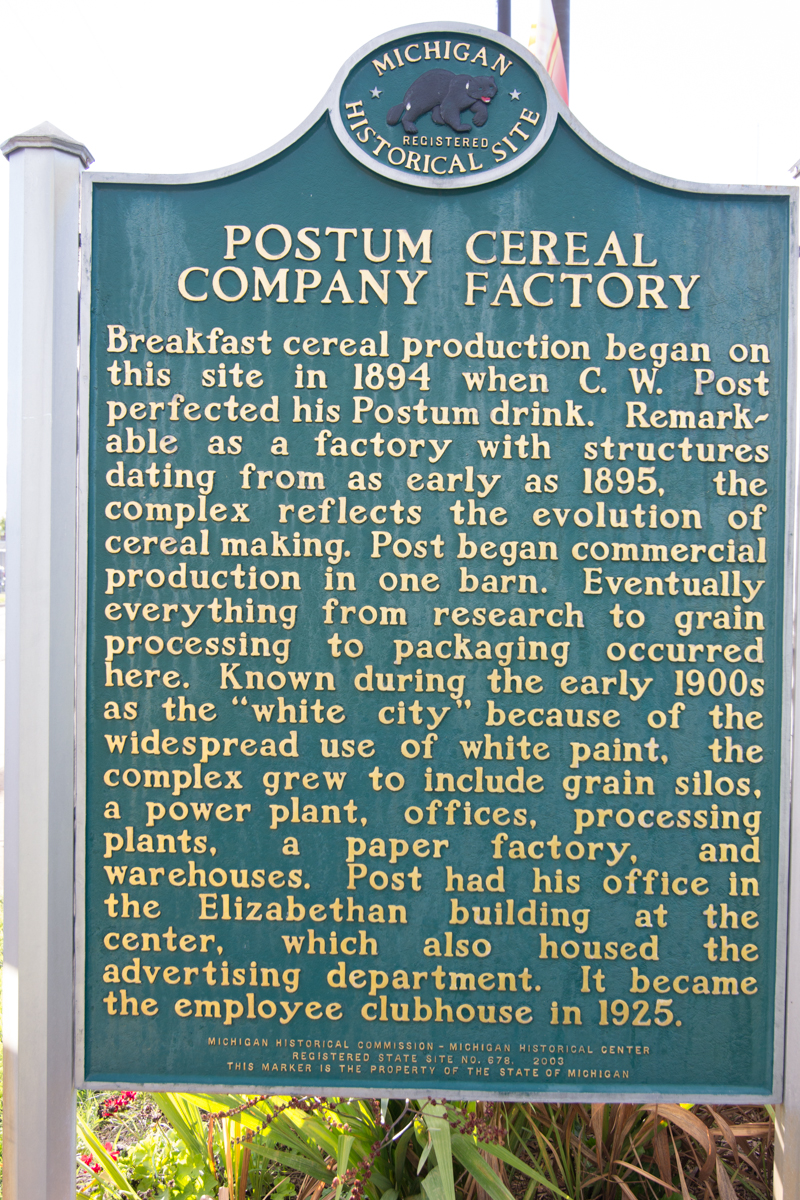
Commemorative plaque at the Postum Cereal Company Factory, September 2014

Starting in 1925, under the leadership of financier (and at one point, son in-law to the founder), E. F. Hutton as chairman and Colby M. Chester as president, Postum Cereal made the first of a series of corporate acquisitions which would within a few years transform it into the dominant US packaged grocery products manufacturer.

It began late that year with the purchase of the Jell-O Company. Jell-O had been first produced in 1897 by Pearle Bixby Wait, a carpenter from the town of LeRoy in northern New York state. Mr. Wait's product was based upon a patent that had been issued to inventor and industrialist Peter Cooper in 1845, but which Cooper had never developed commercially. However, Wait was unsuccessful in marketing Jell-O, and in 1899, he sold the rights to it for $450 to a neighbor, Orator Francis Woodward, who had founded the Genesee Pure Food Company in 1897. Genesee became the Jell-O Company in 1923, the same year it began marketing D-Zerta, a sugar-free gelatin, and a powdered mixture for making ice cream in the kitchen.

In 1926, Postum Cereal acquired Igleheart Brothers, Inc (established in 1856), the makers of Swans Down cake flour, and followed this with the purchase of the Minute Tapioca Company. "Tapioca Superlative" had been invented in 1894 by a Boston woman, Susan Stavers, who made it from tapioca flakes that she ran through her coffee grinder. Later that year, she sold the rights to John Whitman, of Orange, Massachusetts, who changed its name to "Minute Tapioca". In 1908, he changed the name of his company to that of his product. The "Minute" brand would later become better known for a General Foods innovation introduced in 1949 known as Minute Rice, a brand of parboiled rice.

As a consequence of the Jell-O and Minute Tapioca acquisitions, Postum Cereal's revenues in 1926 jumped to $46.9 million. The number of shares stood at 1.375 million, including shares issued to acquire Jell-O and Minute Tapioca. The dividend was increased to $4.70 a year.

The acquisition spree continued in 1927 with the purchase of two similarly named confectionery companies, chocolate-maker Walter Baker (founded in 1765, making it the oldest component of the Postum constituent companies), and coconut-processor Franklin Baker, which had begun early in the 19th century as a flour broker, but whose confectionery products dated from 1895. This was followed by the purchase of Log Cabin Products, the maker of Log Cabin Syrup (first produced in 1887), and of Richard Hellmann, Inc (established in 1913), the producer of Blue Ribbon mayonnaise. And late in the year, Postum Cereal began selling its first coffee product, "Sanka", by obtaining US marketing rights from Dr Ludwig Roselius of Bremen, Germany. Roselius had developed the decaffeinated coffee in 1906 and began selling it in the US in 1923.

Three more acquisitions followed in 1928. The most important was that of the Cheek-Neel Coffee Company. Its product, Maxwell House, dating from 1892, was a well-known brand in what was still a fragmented US coffee market. Within a few years, however, it was to become the number one brand in America and would retain that position well into the 1980s. Also acquired during 1928 was the La France Manufacturing Company, a maker of starch and other laundry products (this being Postum's first venture into nonedibles), and the Calumet Baking Powder Company, the leading maker of this kitchen essential.

Financially, the year culminated on October 1 with the inclusion of Postum, Inc in the newly reformulated Dow Jones Industrial Average of 30 common stocks. By year-end, revenues stood at $101 million and the dividend on the five million authorized shares was $5.00 per year, a 25-fold increase since 1922.

=== Purchase of General Foods and renaming ===
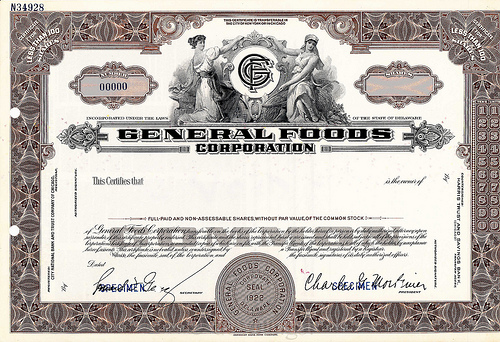
General Foods 1937 Specimen Stock Certificate

By far the most important acquisition of 1929 was of the frozen-food company owned by Clarence Birdseye, called "General Foods Company". Birdseye (December 9, 1886 - October 7, 1956) was one of the most important entrepreneurs in the history of the food industry. Born in New York City, he became interested in the frozen preservation of food during the course of working as a fur trader in Labrador between 1912 and 1916. By 1923, he had developed a commercially viable process for quick-freezing foods using a belt mechanism, which he patented. In 1924, with backing from three investors, he formed the General Seafoods Company, in Gloucester, Massachusetts, to produce frozen haddock fillets packed in plain cardboard boxes.

The founder's daughter, Marjorie Merriweather Post, was first to become excited about the prospects for the frozen foods business. In 1926, she had put into port at Gloucester on her yacht, Hussar (IV), and was served a luncheon meal which, she learned to her amazement, had been frozen six months before. Although she eventually became the richest woman in America because of her business genius, it took Marjorie Post three years to finally convince Postum's management to acquire the company. In a deal arranged by Marjorie, who immediately understood the value of Clarence Birdseye's patents, Postum paid $10.75 million for a 51% interest and its partner, Goldman Sachs, paid $12.5 million for the other 49%. Following this acquisition, Postum, Inc changed its name to General Foods Corporation. Goldman sold its share back to General Foods in 1932, apparently at a slight loss.

Shortly after the acquisition, General Foods began test-marketing an expanded line of frozen foods, but the company quickly realized that a packaging process alone would not be sufficient to market frozen products in stores, and visual merchandising was required to display products. To be sold, the packages had to be kept frozen while on display, so Birdseye engineers began development of a freezer cabinet designed specifically to hold frozen foods. The cabinet, which first appeared in 1934, required a great deal of space and electricity, and during the Great Depression, any expense for a grocery store for new equipment needed both retail profit and regular consumer purchases beyond basic new product curiousity to justify. For those stores which could accommodate them, the payback was immediate. Housewives quickly realized that keeping packages of frozen food in the icebox could mean fresher meals and fewer trips to the market.

The company published a cookbook in 1932, the General Foods Cook Book, dedicated "To the American homemaker". Five editions were published between 1932 and 1937. The book includes photographs (among which is "General Foods offers over twenty famous products for your well-stocked pantry shelf") and a subject index.

== After General Foods ==
Philip Morris Companies acquired General Foods in 1985 and Kraft Inc. in 1988, eventually merging them as Kraft Foods Inc. before the cereal unit was sold to Ralcorp in 2007.

In 2011, Ralcorp announced plans to spin off Post Foods into a separate company. About a quarter of Ralcorp's sales in 2010 were generated by its Post Foods unit. The spinoff was completed with an IPO for Post Holdings, Inc. on February 7, 2012.

In 2014, the company acquired Michael Foods, headquartered in Minnetonka, Minnesota, for $2.45 billion.

The following year, Post Foods purchased MOM Brands (formerly Malt-O-Meal Co.) creating the third largest breakfast cereal company in the US. At this point, Post Foods rebranded as Post Consumer Brands, and is headquartered in Lakeville, Minnesota.

In July 2017, Post Holdings bought Weetabix Limited (including US subsidiary Barbara's) for £1.4 billion. In 2019, the company began combining some of its MOM Brands and Weetabix cereal brands under the Three Sisters Cereal name.

On December 8, 2020, Post Holdings announced that it was acquiring the Peter Pan peanut butter brand from Conagra Brands. The transaction was completed on January 25, 2021. With the acquisition of Peter Pan peanut butter on January 25, 2021, Post created a new group called Animated Brands, with the Peter Pan brand being the founding member. Animated Brands is managed under Post Consumer Brands.

On June 1, 2021, Post announced its acquisition of the ready-to-eat ("RTE") cereal business of TreeHouse Foods. A similar deal two years earlier had been scuttled by antitrust concerns from the Federal Trade Commission. The TreeHouse Foods RTE cereal business was added to Post Consumer Brands' broad portfolio of private label cereal products.

In February 2023, Post Holdings announced its acquisition of pet food brands like 9Lives, Kibbles 'n Bits and Gravy Train. Such acquisition would enable Post's entry to the 'pet food category'. After the completion of this acquisition, Post intends to develop a new pet food category within Post Consumer Brands.

=== Postum advertisements ===
Postum, a coffee substitute made out of roasted grain, was created in 1895. It was popular through the early 20th century, particularly during World War II when coffee was rationed.

Due to its decline in popularity, Post announced its discontinuation in 2007. It was later revived by Eliza's Quest Food in 2013.

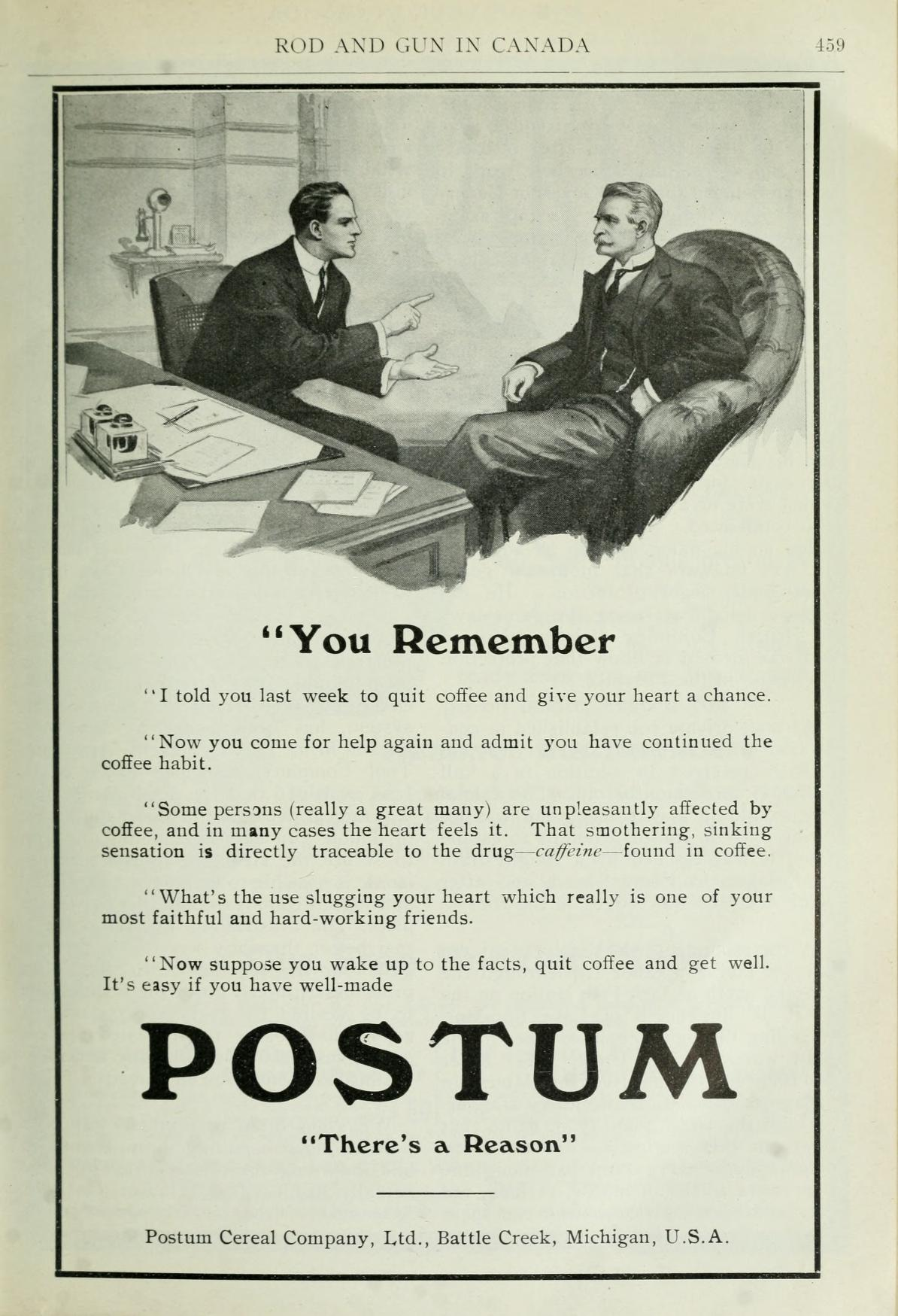

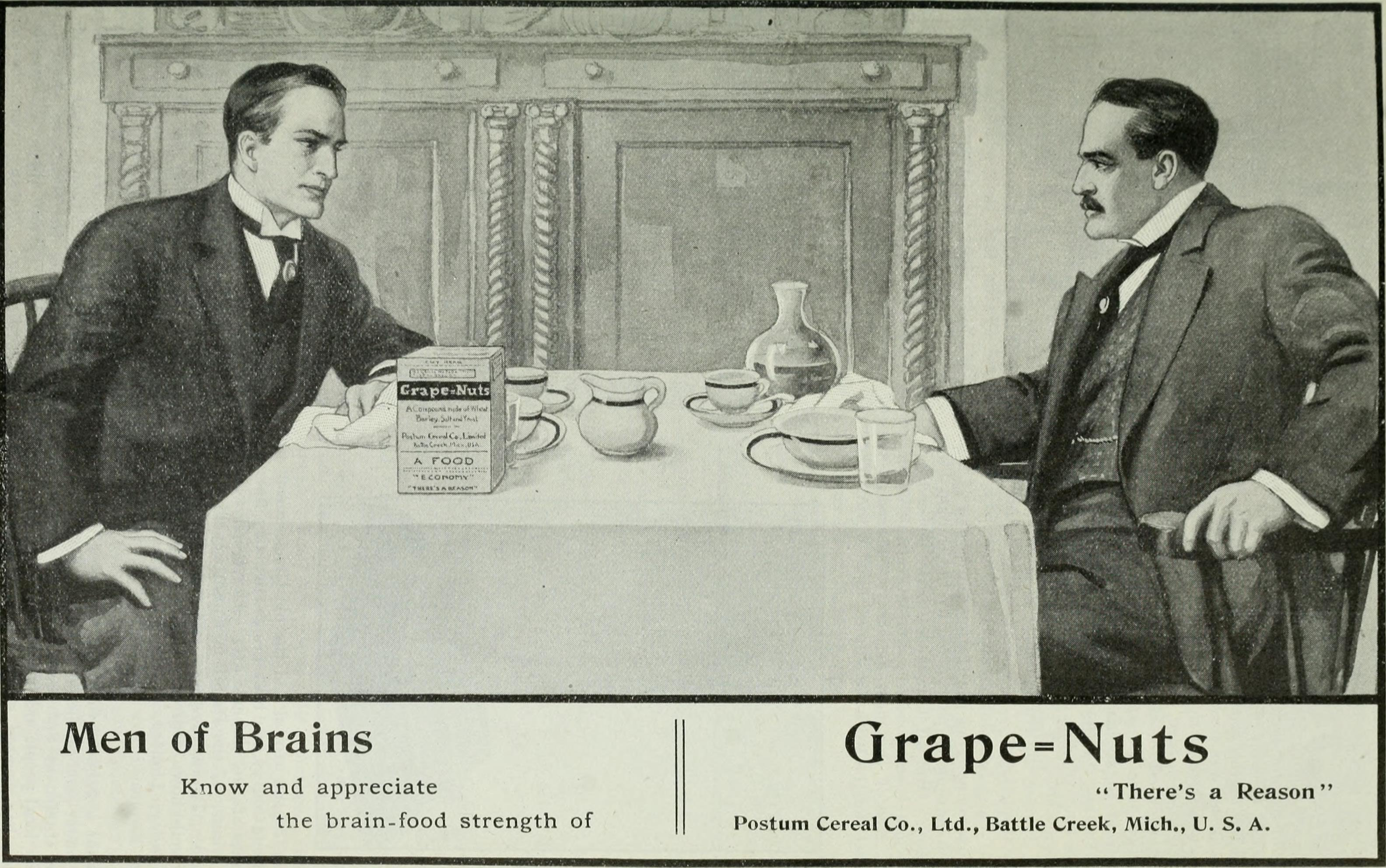

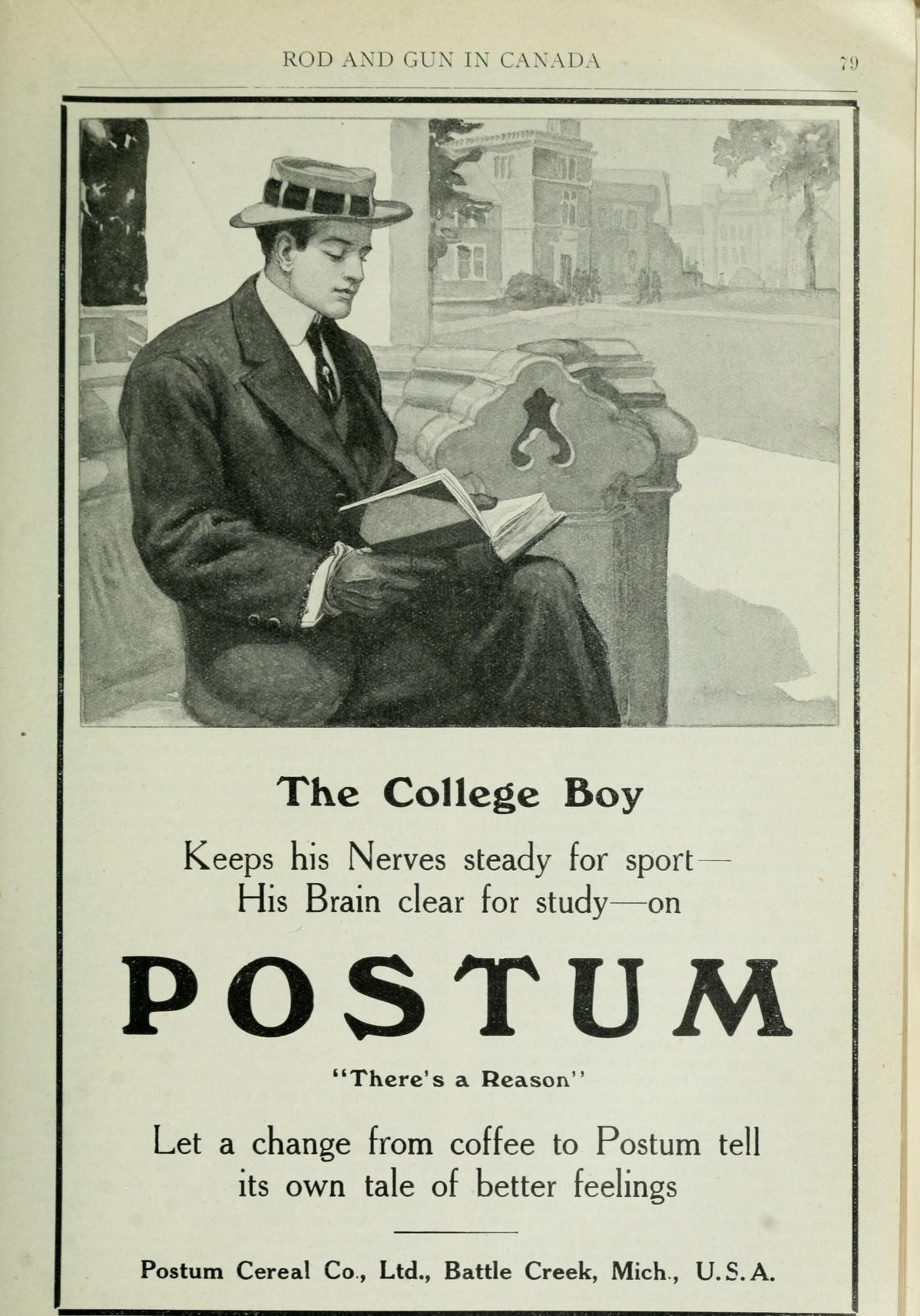

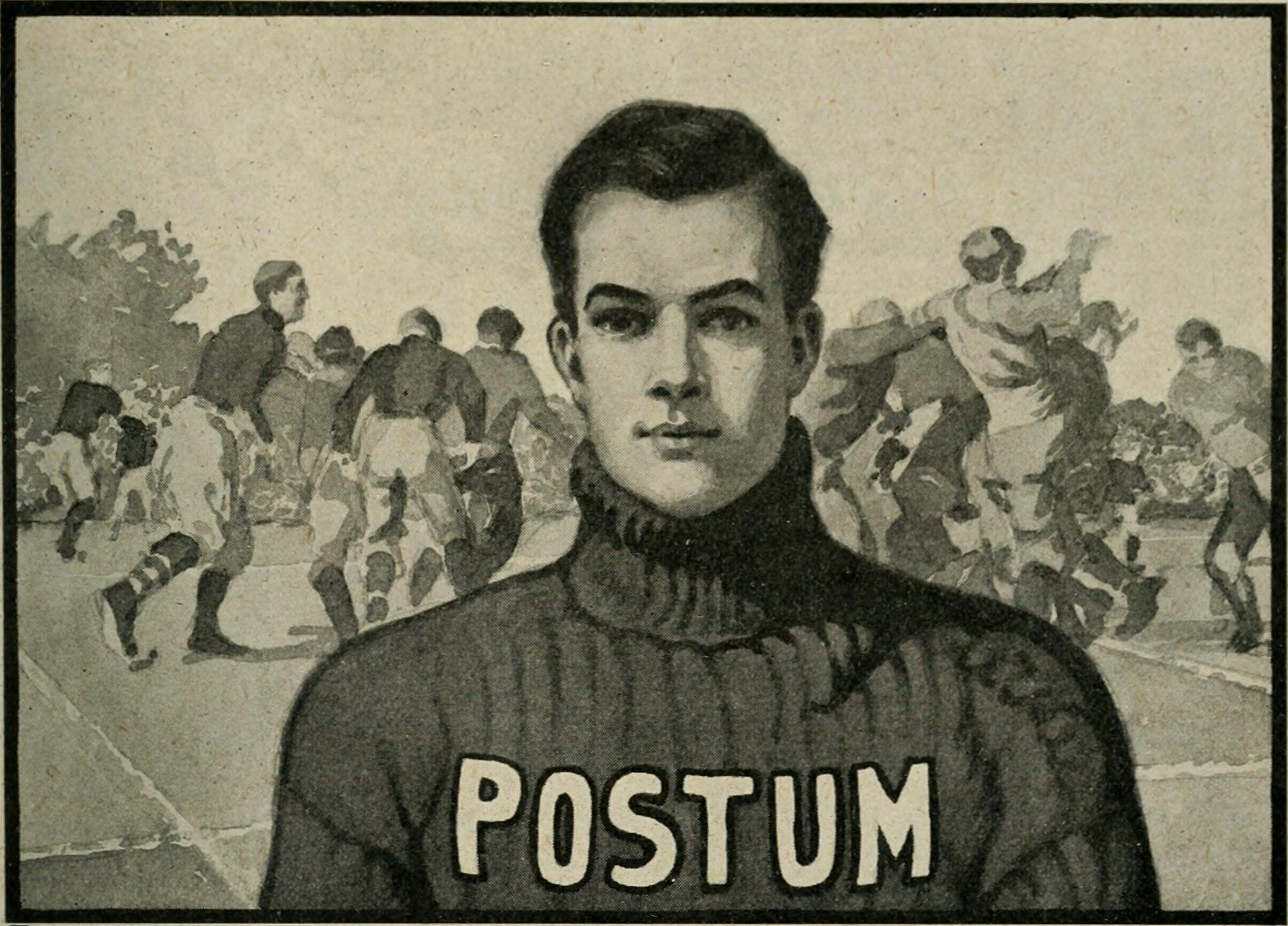

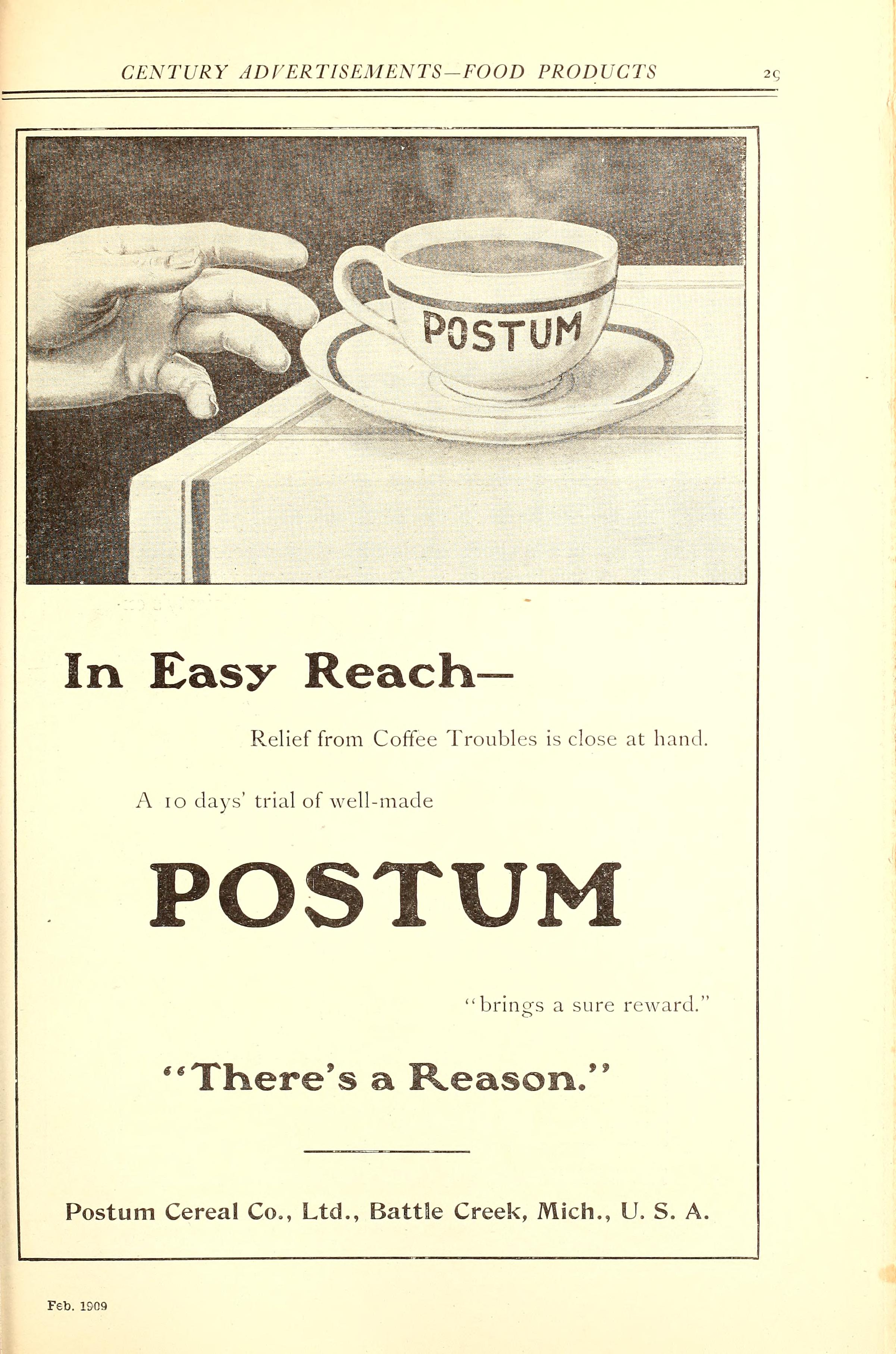

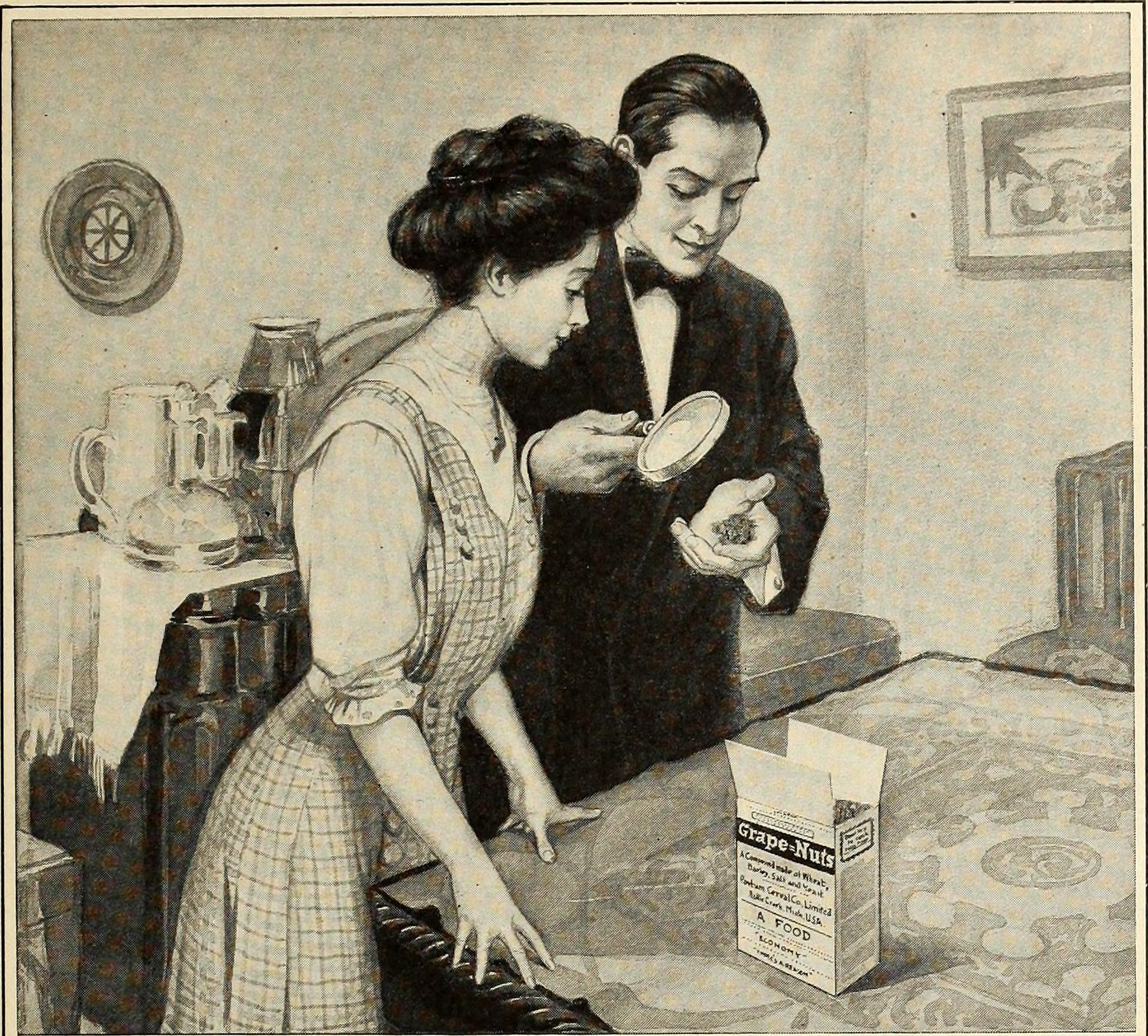

== Current products ==
- 100% Bran – currently only available in Canada
- Airly Foods - Butter
- Airly Foods - Cheddar
- Airly Foods - Chocolate
- Airly Foods - Cinnamon
- Airly Foods - Salted Caramel
- Airly Foods - Sea Salt
- Barbara's
- Bran Flakes
- Better Oats
  - Better Oats - 100 Calorie Maple & Brown Sugar
  - Better Oats - 100 Calorie Apples & Cinnamon
  - Better Oats - 100 Calorie Cinnamon Roll
  - Better Oats - Classic Maple & Brown Sugar
  - Better Oats - Classic Strawberries & Cream
  - Better Oats - Organic Maple and Brown Sugar
  - Better Oats - Organic Bare
  - Better Oats - Organic Old Fashioned Oats
  - Better Oats - Organic Steel Cut Oats
  - Better Oats - Organic Quick Oats
  - Better Oats - Steel Cut Maple & Brown Sugar
  - Better Oats - Steel Cut Maple & Brown Sugar with Protein
  - Better Oats - Steel Cut Original
  - Better Oats - Thick & Hearty Maple & Brown Sugar
  - Better Oats - Thick & Hearty Apples & Cinnamon
  - Better Oats - Thick & Hearty Blueberry Muffin
- CoCo Wheats
- Farina (food) Mills hot wheat cereal
- Cocoa Pebbles
- Fruity Pebbles
- Marshmallow Fruity Pebbles
- Fruity Pebbles Treats
- Fruity Pebbles Crisps
- Cocoa Pebbles Crisps
- Golden Crisp
- Grape-Nuts
- Grape-Nuts Flakes
- Great Grains Banana Nut Crunch
- Great Grains Blueberry Morning
- Great Grains Cranberry Almond Crunch
- Great Grains Crunchy Pecans
- Great Grains Raisins, Dates & Pecans
- Honey Bunches of Oats
  - Honey Bunches of Oats – Honey Roasted
  - Honey Bunches of Oats – with Almonds
  - Honey Bunches of Oats – with Real Strawberries
  - Honey Bunches of Oats – Vanilla
  - Honey Bunches of Oats – Pecan & Maple Brown Sugar
  - Honey Bunches of Oats – Frosted
  - Honey Bunches of Oats – Whole Grain Honey Crunch
  - Honey Bunches of Oats – Granola – Honey Roasted
  - Honey Bunches of Oats – Granola – French Vanilla
  - Honey Bunches of Oats – Granola – Maple Pecan
- Honey Maid S'mores
- Honeycomb
- Honeycomb Big Bites Original
- Honeycomb Big Bites Chocolate
- Oh's
- Oreo O's
- Malt-O-Meal
  - Malt-O-Meal - Maple & Brown Sugar Hot Wheat
  - Malt-O-Meal - Chocolate Hot Wheat
  - Malt-O-Meal - Original Hot Wheat
  - Malt-O-Meal - Apple Zings
  - Malt-O-Meal - Berry Colossal Crunch
  - Malt-O-Meal - Berry Colossal Crunch with Marshmallows
  - Malt-O-Meal - Chocolate Marshmallow Mateys
  - Malt-O-Meal - Chocolately Chip Cookie Bites
  - Malt-O-Meal - Churr-O's
  - Malt-O-Meal - Cinnamon Toasters
  - Malt-O-Meal - Coco Roos
  - Malt-O-Meal - Cocoa Dyno-Bites
  - Malt-O-Meal - Cocoa Dyno-Bites with Marshmallows
  - Malt-O-Meal - Cookies & Cream
  - Malt-O-Meal - Crispy Rice
  - Malt-O-Meal - Frosted Flakes
  - Malt-O-Meal - Frosted Mini Spooners
  - Malt-O-Meal - Fruity Blasts
  - Malt-O-Meal - Fruity Dyno-Bites
  - Malt-O-Meal - Fruity Dyno-Bites with Marshmallows
  - Malt-O-Meal - Golden Honey O's
  - Malt-O-Meal - Golden Puffs
  - Malt-O-Meal - Honey Buzzers
  - Malt-O-Meal - Honey Graham Toasters
  - Malt-O-Meal - Honey Nut Scooters
  - Malt-O-Meal - Marshmallow Mateys
  - Malt-O-Meal - Oat Blenders with Almonds
  - Malt-O-Meal - Oat Blenders with Honey
  - Malt-O-Meal - Peanut Butter Cups
  - Malt-O-Meal - Raisin Bran
  - Malt-O-Meal - S'mores
  - Malt-O-Meal - Strawberry Cream Mini Spooners
  - Malt-O-Meal - Tootie Fruities
  - Malt-O-Meal - Tootie Fruities with Marshmallows
- Post Dunkin' cereal - Caramel Macchiato
- Post Premier Protein cereal - Chocolate Almond
- Post Premier Protein cereal - Mixed Berry Almond
- Raisin Bran
- Shredded Wheat (made by Nestlé and General Mills in the United Kingdom and Ireland)
- Shredded Wheat – Original Spoon Size
- Shredded Wheat – Original Big Biscuit
- Shredded Wheat – Wheat'N Bran Spoon Size
- Shreddies – currently only available in Canada, the United Kingdom, Ireland, and Germany (made by Nestlé and General Mills in the United Kingdom and Ireland)
- Waffle Crisp

== Discontinued cereals ==
- 40% Bran Flakes
- Alpha-Bits
- Beep Beep (with the Wile E. Coyote and the Road Runner as mascots)
- BlueBerry Morning
- Bran & Prune Flakes
- Cinna-Crunch Pebbles (discontinued 2001)
- Corn Crackos
- Corn-Fetti (early 1950s), later known as Sugar Coated Corn Flakes (late 1950s), later known as Sugar Sparkled Corn Flakes (1960s)
- Corn Flakes & Blueberries
- Corn Flakes & Peaches
- Corn Flakes & Strawberries
- Count Off
- Crispy Critters
- Crispy Numbers (in Canada)
- Cröonchy Stars
- Cupcake Pebbles
- C.W. Post (granola cereal, discontinued 1994)
- Dino Pebbles
- Dino S'mores Pebbles
- Fruity Pebbles Xtreme
- Cinnamon Pebbles
- Fortified Oat Flakes
- Fruit & Bran (formerly Fruit & Fibre)
- Fruit Wheats (Shredded Wheat variant, discontinued 1990)
- Golden Oreo O's
- Good MOREnings Cocoa Cinnamon (chocolate flavored rings)
- Good MOREnings Berry Wheels (strawberry flavored rings)
- Good MOREnings Strawberries 'n' Creme (strawberry-flavored corn flakes)
- Good MOREnings Waffle Crunch (a variation of Waffle Crisp)
- Grape-Nuts Fit
- Grape Nut O's
- Great Grains Digestive Blends – Berry Medley
- Great Grains Digestive Blends – Vanilla
- Great Grains Protein Blend – Cinnamon Hazelnut
- Great Grains Protein Blend – Honey, Oats & Seeds
- Heart of Oats
- Honey Bunches of Oats – Just Bunches – Honey Roasted
- Honey Bunches of Oats – Just Bunches – Cinnamon
- Honey Bunches of Oats – with Real Peaches
- Honey Bunches of Oats – Granola – Raspberry
- Honey Bunches of Oats – Granola – Cinnamon
- Honey Bunches of Oats – Granola – Protein Chocolate
- Honey Bunches of Oats – Morning Energy – Chocolatey Almond Crunch
- Honey Bunches of Oats – Morning Energy – Cinnamon Crunch
- Honey Bunches of Oats – Fruit Blends – Banana Blueberry
- Honey Bunches of Oats – Fruit Blends – Peach Raspberry
- Honey Bunches of Oats – Greek – Honey Crunch
- Honey Bunches of Oats – Greek – Mixed Berry
- Honey Bunches of Oats – Tropical Blends – Mango Coconut
- Honey Bunches of Oats – Raisin Medley
- Honey Bunches of Oats – with Cinnamon Bunches
- Honey Maid Honey Graham
- Hulk
- Huskies
- Marshmallow Alpha-Bits
- Mini Cinnamon Churros - sweetened wheat breakfast cereal based on the churro.
- Marshmallow Pebbles
- Oat Flakes
- Pink Panther Flakes
- Poppin' Pebbles
- Post Extra
- Post Ghosties (with Casper the Friendly Ghost as its mascot)
- Post Honey Nut Crunch Raisin Bran
- Post Size 8
- Post-Tens, an assortment of 10 single-serving boxes of seven different Post cereals in one package, designed to compete with Kellogg's Variety Pack
- Post Toasties
- Post Top 3
- Puffed Corn Flakes
- Raisin Grape-Nuts
- Reptar Crunch
- Rice Krinkles (originally Sugar Krinkles, then Sugar Rice Krinkles, finally Frosted Rice Krinkles before discontinuation)
- Selects Banana Nut Crunch
- Selects Maple Pecan Crunch
- Sesame Street Cereal – Apple
- Sesame Street Cereal - Blueberry
- Sesame Street Cereal - Strawberry
- Shredded Wheat – Frosted Cinnamon Roll
- Shredded Wheat – Frosted Mixed berry
- Shredded Wheat – Frosted S'mores Bites
- Shredded Wheat – Honey Nut Spoon Size
- Shredded Wheat – Lightly Frosted Spoon Size
- Shredded Wheat – Vanilla Almond Spoon Size
- Smurfberry Crunch
- Smurf Magic Berries
- Sour Patch Kids cereal
- Strawberry Honeycomb
- Super Orange Crisp
- TEAM Flakes
- Trail Mix Crunch – Cranberry Vanilla (discontinued Fall 2010)
- Trail Mix Crunch – Raisin and Almond

== See also ==
- Close City, Texas
- Marjorie Merriweather Post
- Post, Texas
