= C. W. Post =

American businessman (1854–1914)

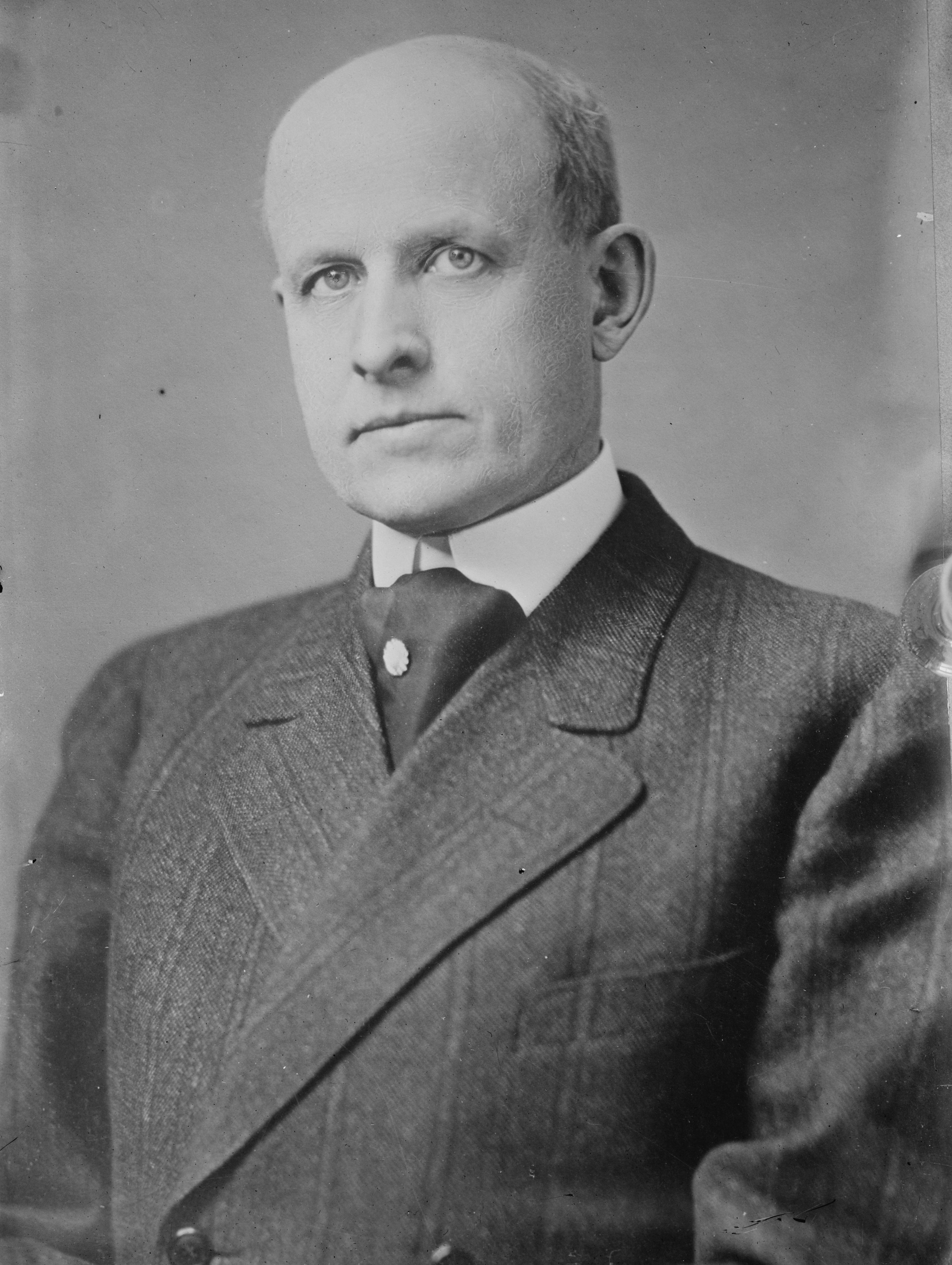
- Born: Charles William Post; October 26, 1854; Springfield, Illinois, U.S.
- Died: May 9, 1914 (aged 59); Santa Barbara, California, U.S.
- Resting place: Oak Hill Cemetery, Battle Creek, Michigan
- Occupation: Businessman
- Spouses: Ella Letitia Merriweather (m. 1874; div. 1904) Leila Young (m. 1904)
- Children: Marjorie Merriweather Post
- Mother: Caroline Lathrop Post
- Relatives: Eleanor Post Hutton (granddaughter); Dina Merrill (granddaughter)

Charles William Post (October 26, 1854 – May 9, 1914) was an American businessman. He was the founder of what became Post Consumer Brands.

== Early life and education ==
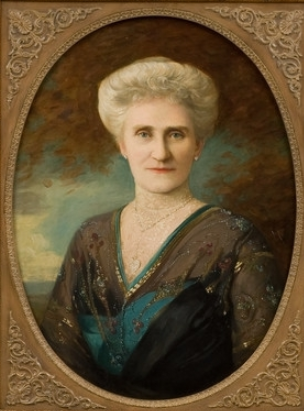
In November 1874, Post married Ella Letitia Merriweather.

Post was born October 26, 1854, in Springfield, Illinois, the son of Charles Rollin Post and Caroline Lathrop Post, and grew up in the adopted hometown of Abraham Lincoln, who served as President of the United States during Post's childhood.

Post graduated from public schools in Springfield, and then enrolled at Illinois Industrial University, where he remained for two years before leaving without a degree.

After a brief stay in Independence, Kansas, Post returned to Springfield, where he remained for over a decade working as a salesman and manufacturer of agricultural machinery. During this interval Post invented and patented several farm implements, including a plow, a harrow, and a hay-stacking machine.

In November 1874, Post married Ella Letitia Merriweather; they had one daughter, Marjorie. Ella supported her husband throughout his career and cared for him when he was ill. As Post became wealthier and began spending more time away from Ella, who was often ill, his relationship with her waned. Against her wishes, Post separated from her in 1904 and married his second wife, Leila Young, his 27-year-old secretary, in November 1904. Marjorie, who remained close to her father, later said that her mother died of "a broken heart" after Post divorced her and married his secretary. In a deceitful attempt to have his daughter become closer with his secretary (soon to be wife), he hired her to be a travel companion for Marjorie. When Marjorie realized the ruse, she deeply resented Leila.

== Career ==
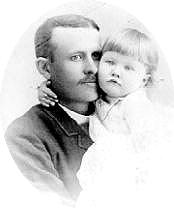
Post holding his only child, daughter Marjorie Merriweather Post

Post suffered a mental breakdown in November 1885, the result of the stress and overwork which accompanied his job as a farm implement manufacturer. Post made a break with his previous life, moving to Texas in 1886, where he came into association with a group of real estate developers in Fort Worth, who were attempting to establish a new community on the eastern outskirts of a town called Riverside. In 1888, Post began a real estate development of his own in Fort Worth on 200 acres (81 ha) that he had obtained, platting the land for streets and homes and constructing two mills.

The stress of this work again proved too much for Post's constitution, and a second breakdown followed in 1891. Post began a period of extensive travels in search of a cure, coming to take particular interest in the chemistry of digestion. After a period traversing Europe, Post visited the Battle Creek Sanitarium of Battle Creek, Michigan, a facility operated by John Harvey Kellogg (brother of Kellogg Company founder Will Keith Kellogg). Post has been accused of stealing several of Kellogg's recipes, including Kellogg's Caramel Coffee Cereal (Post's Postum), Cornflakes (Post Toasties) and granola (Grape-Nuts).

In 1895, Post founded Postum Cereal Co., with his first product, Postum cereal beverage. Post's first breakfast cereal premiered in 1897, and he named the product Grape-Nuts cereal because of the fruity aroma noticed during the manufacturing process and the nutty crunch of the finished product. In 1904, he followed up the Grape-Nuts label with a brand of corn flakes, which was first called Elijah's Manna before being renamed Post Toasties in 1908. The British government refused to allow Post to market his cereal in the United Kingdom using the name Elijah's Manna, stating that it was sacrilegious.

In 1906, Post invested some of his substantial earnings from his food products manufacturing into Texas real estate, purchasing a massive 225,000-acre (91,000 ha) tract in Garza and Lynn Counties. Post platted a new town, which he called Post City. Shade trees were planted, farm parcels laid out, and a hotel, a school, churches, and a department store were constructed for the new Garza County seat.

In 1907, Collier's Weekly published an article questioning the claim made in advertisements that Grape-Nuts could cure appendicitis. Post responded with advertisements questioning the mental capacity of the article's author, and Collier's Weekly sued for libel. The case was heard in 1910, and Post was fined $50,000. The decision was overturned on appeal, but advertisements for Postum products stopped making such claims.

Post was a staunch opponent of the trade union movement and was remembered by the National Association of Manufacturers as one who "opposed bitterly boycotts, strikes, lockouts, picketing and other forms of coercion in the relations between employer and employee". Post was also a leading public advocate of the open shop system. However, as compensation, Post paid the highest wages, and provided bonuses and benefits. Near Battle Creek, he had model homes built that were sold to employees under certain conditions.

== Death and legacy ==
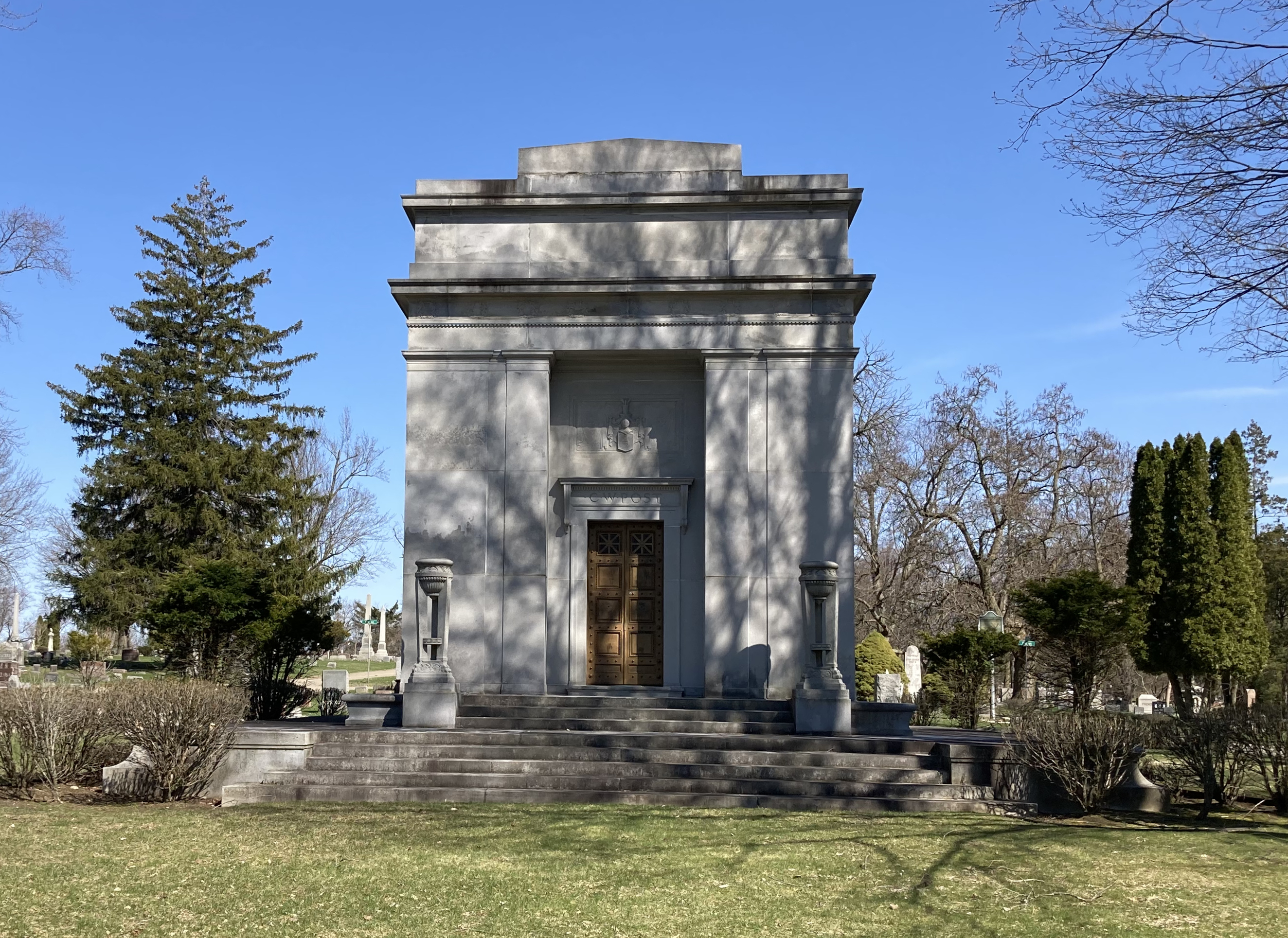
Post's mausoleum at Oak Hill Cemetery

By the end of 1913, Post's health deteriorated to the point that he canceled public appearances. In early March 1914, he was believed to be suffering from appendicitis and was rushed via a nonstop train from California to the Mayo Clinic in Rochester, Minnesota. He was operated on by William Mayo and Charles Mayo, who were regarded as the nation's preeminent surgeons at the time. The Mayo brothers operated successfully on Post sometime between March 5 and 10, 1914, but Post's abdominal pain persisted, according to the book American Empress: The Life and Times of Marjorie Merriweather Post.

Post then returned to his home in Santa Barbara, California, with his stomach pain persisting. On May 9, 1914, at age 59, despondent over his ongoing stomach illness and its symptoms, Post committed suicide by shooting. He was interred at Oak Hill Cemetery in Battle Creek.

Post's 27-year-old daughter, Marjorie Merriweather Post, inherited his company along with most of his vast fortune, one of the largest of the early 20th century.

Marjorie Merriweather Post later married financier Edward Francis Hutton and owned a 177-acre (72 ha) estate on Long Island's North Shore called "Hillwood". Marjorie sold the estate in 1951 for $200,000 to Long Island University, which founded its residential C. W. Post College in 1954, marking the 100th anniversary of C. W. Post's birth. For a while it was named the C. W. Post Center and then the C. W. Post Campus. What was C. W. Post College has become mainly a commuter campus called LIU/Post with about 8,500 full- and part-time students and over 100,000 alumni.

The World War II Liberty Ship, SS C. W. Post, was named in his honor.

== See also ==
- Close City, Texas
- Post Foods
- Garza County Historical Museum
- General Foods
- C. W. Post Memorial Camp
