= Secret recipe =

A secret recipe is a recipe whose details are held under secrecy, usually (especially in commercial circumstances) protected by law as a trade secret.

Secret Recipe may also refer to:

- Secret Recipe (restaurant), a lifestyle café chain in Malaysia
- Secret Recipe (Buckethead DVD), a two disc DVD set by musician Buckethead
- Colonel's secret recipe, the trade secret spice mix used by fast food chain KFC in the preparation of their chicken
- "The Secret Recipe", a 2023 song by Lil Yachty and J. Cole
- The Secret Recipe, a 2023 EP by Lil Yachty

== See also ==
- Trade secret
