= Farina (food) =

Milled wheat

- Farina topped with strawberries
- Type: Cereal
- Course: Breakfast
- Serving temperature: Warm
- Main ingredients: Wheat

Farina is a form of milled wheat popular in the United States. It is often cooked as a hot breakfast cereal, or porridge. The word farina comes from the Latin word for 'meal' or 'flour'. Farina is milled from hard red wheat (spring or winter variants). In commercially available farina, the bran and most of the germ are removed. Cream of Wheat, Malt-O-Meal, and Farina Mills are popular brand names of breakfast cereal.

== See also ==
- Wheatena
- Semolina
- List of porridges
