= MOM Brands =

American breakfast cereal company

- Type: Subsidiary
- Industry: Cereal
- Founded: 1919; 107 years ago
- Founder: John S. Campbell
- Defunct: 2015; 11 years ago
- Fate: Purchased by Post Holdings; remaining as a subsidiary under a new name
- Successor: Post Consumer Brands
- Headquarters: Lakeville, Minnesota, U.S.
- Key people: Chris Neugent (chairman & CEO); John A. Gappa (CFO); Gene Pagel (CIO); Jesse Garcia (CSO)
- Products: Hot and cold cereals
- Revenue: US$750 million
- Number of employees: 1,400
- Parent: Post Holdings (2015–present)
- Website: PostConsumerBrands.com

MOM Brands Company (formerly Malt-O-Meal Company and Campbell Cereal Company) is an American producer of breakfast cereals, headquartered in Northfield, Minnesota, and now owned by Post Consumer Brands. It markets its products in at least 70% of the country's grocery stores, with estimated sales in 2012 of US$750 million. It operates four manufacturing plants, in Northfield, Minnesota; Tremonton, Utah; Asheboro, North Carolina; and St. Ansgar, Iowa. The company has distribution centers in Grove City, Ohio; Coppell, Texas; and Salt Lake City, Utah.

MOM Brands produces both hot and cold cereals, including Malt-O-Meal, a combination of farina wheat and malted barley. As of 2012, cold cereals manufactured by MOM Brands accounts for over 75% of its total sales. Most of its cold cereals are similar to those produced by its competitors, Kellogg's, Quaker Oats Company, and General Mills. Even so, between 2001 and 2012, Malt-O-Meal more than tripled its market share during a very challenging time for the breakfast cereal category. It was the fastest-growing cereal company in America.

MOM Brands was bought by Post Holdings in 2015. After the acquisition was finalized, Post Holdings moved its cereal headquarters office from New Jersey to the MOM Brands offices in Lakeville, Minnesota. The business was renamed Post Consumer Brands, and the MOM Brands CEO, Chris Neugent, and his senior leadership team were put in charge of the new combined enterprise.

== History ==
The company was founded in 1919 as the Campbell Cereal Company by John Campbell, a miller in Owatonna, Minnesota. He invented a combination of farina wheat and malted barley hot breakfast cereal he called Malt-O-Meal. Campbell intended to compete with Cream of Wheat.

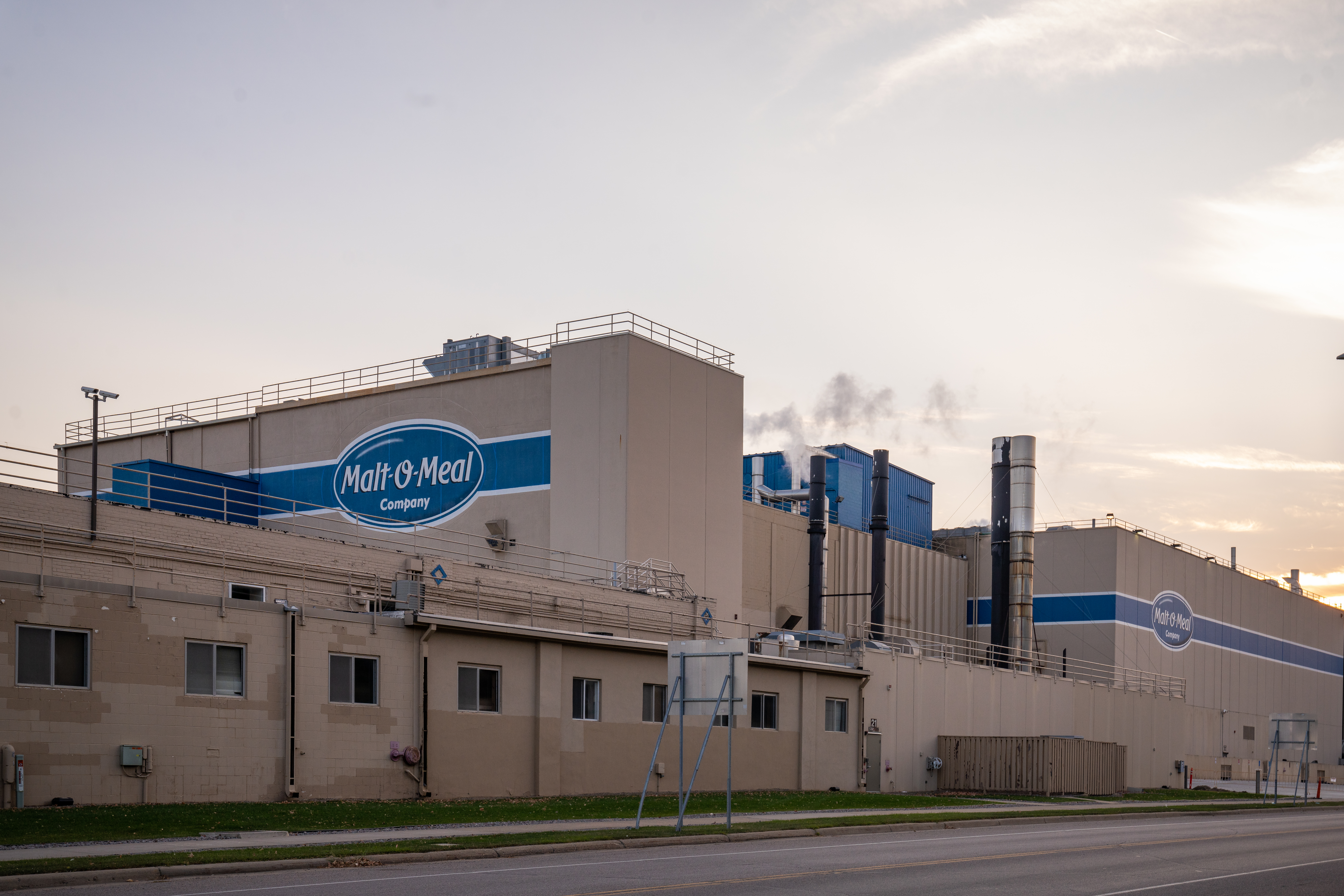
Malt-O-Meal Company plant in Northfield, Minnesota

In 1927, the company moved production of its cereal to the Ames Mill in Northfield, Minnesota. Nine years later, corporate headquarters were moved to Minneapolis, Minnesota, and in 1953, it was renamed the Malt-O-Meal Company. Production facilities remained in Northfield, with the addition of the Campbell Mill (opened 1965) and the distribution center (opened 1987).

Attempts in the 1940s to market Campbell's Corn Flakes, and in the 1960s to sell State Fair brand Puffed Wheat and Puffed Rice, were abandoned in the face of competition.

In 1998 Malt-O-Meal began construction of a 225,000-square-foot (20,900 m^{2}) $100,000,000 cereal production facility in Tremonton, Utah. In early 2001, construction was stopped and the plant was mothballed because the company had a significant decline in sales and profits. At that time, the company also had to implement layoffs to reduce costs. Later in 2001, the building and site were put up for sale for $10 million. in 2002, Malt-O-Meal began a dramatic turnaround in sales and profits. Because of the much improved results, the site was taken off the market, construction was resumed, and the Malt-Meal Tremonton plant began production in 2004.

In 2002, Malt-O-Meal acquired the bagged cereal business from the Quaker Oats Company.

In 2007, Malt-O-Meal took part in the "reverse product placement" marketing campaign for The Simpsons Movie and packaged one of their cereals, Tootie Frooties, as "Krusty-O's". The cereal was sold in 7-Eleven stores across America along with other The Simpsons Movie related products.

In 2007, Malt-O-Meal began construction on their new manufacturing facility in Asheboro, North Carolina. The building, formerly occupied by Unilever Best Foods, became the fourth manufacturing facility for Malt-O-Meal. Operations at the plant began in late 2008.

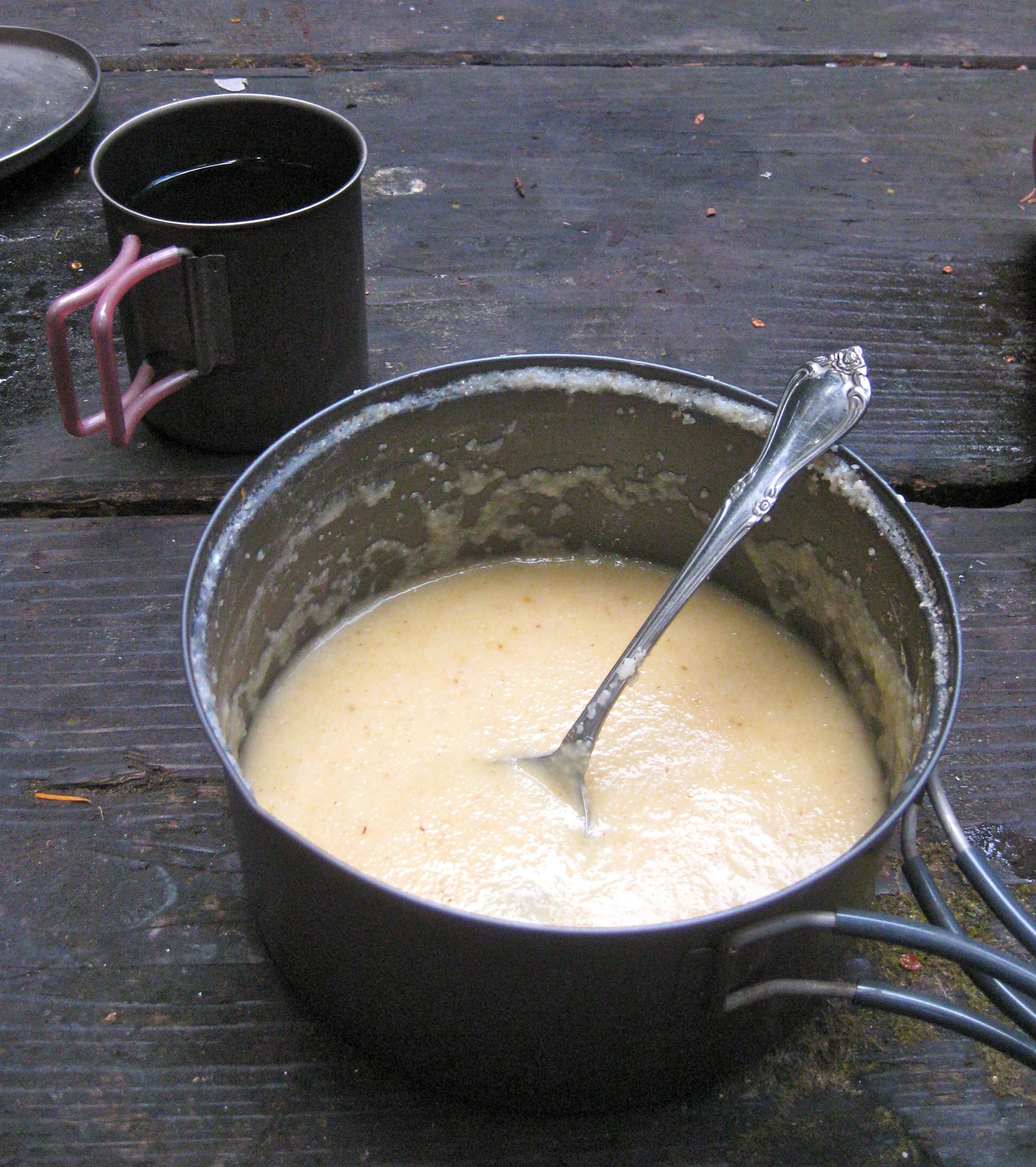
Mug of coffee with a camping saucepan of Malt-O-Meal cereal

In December 2009, Malt-O-Meal acquired the Farina brand of hot cereal from U.S. Mills. Farina was started by Pillsbury in 1898.

On February 21, 2012, the Malt-O-Meal Company re-branded as MOM Brands—the new name is intended to reflect the company's wider product range, while still acknowledging its flagship product through the use of its abbreviation. At the same time, it also announced that it had surpassed Post to become the third largest producer of cereals in the United States.

MOM Brands purchased the CoCo Wheats brand from Denny and Kim Fuller on June 30, 2012, while the rest of the company assets except the factory building were sold to Gilster-Mary Lee, a major competitor. The Fullers had become the fourth generation to own and operate Little Crow in 1983.

In 2013 MOM Brands introduced Mom's Best Naturals cereal and gained significant shelf space in retailers. This was a part of its success which helped it surpass Post cereal in total market share of cereal sales. After Post bought MOM brands it kept the MOM's best brand and it is still a part of its portfolio.

On January 27, 2015, Post Holdings announced that it was purchasing MOM Brands for $1.15 billion ($1.05 billion cash and 2.5 million shares of Post Holdings stock). The sale was completed on May 4, 2015. Production of cold cereal continued in the Northfield plant. As of January 2024, Post is continuing the Malt-O-Meal brand.

== See also ==
- Post Holdings
