= Swerve =

Swerve may refer to:

- Turning an automobile sharply to avoid a road hazard
- Clinamen, a concept in early atomic theory
- The curved flight of a spinning object due to the Magnus effect
- A brand of Erythritol-based sugar substitute

== Sport ==
- Swerve Strickland, American professional wrestler
- Swerve (professional wrestling), a sudden change in the direction of a "storyline"

== Music ==
- Swerve (album), by Giant Sand
- "Swerve" (Starrah and Diplo song), 2017
- "Swerve" (Jay1 song), 2021
- "Swerve", a 2021 song by Papa Roach from Ego Trip

== Literature ==
- Swerve (magazine), a Canadian magazine for LGBT readers
- The Swerve, a 2011 nonfiction book by Stephen Greenblatt
- Swerve (novel), by Phillip Gwynne
- Swerve, a digital imprint of St. Martin's Press

== Other uses ==
- Swerve (film), a 2011 Australian thriller film directed by Craig Lahiff
- The Swerve (film), a 2018 American horror-drama film directed by Dean Kapsalis
- Swerve (drink), a dairy drink produced by the Coca-Cola Company
- Swerve (Transformers), a character from the Transformers toyline
- Swerve (Friday Night Lights), an episode of the TV series Friday Night Lights

== See also ==
- Swervin (disambiguation)
- Swivel
- Swerved, a hidden camera prank show featuring WWE performers
