= Apotekarnes Cola =

Cola-flavoured soft drink

- Type: Soft drink
- Manufacturer: Pripps/Carlsberg Sverige
- Introduced: late 1990s
- Variants: julmust sockerdricka hallonmust
- Related products: Coca-Cola; Pepsi-Cola

Apotekarnes Cola was a cola-flavoured soft drink produced in Sweden by Pripps/Carlsberg Sverige.

Pripps held the license to sell Coca-Cola until the late 1990s when this license was lost. The other soft drink flavours of the Pripps brewery - such as julmust, sockerdricka and hallonmust - had been using the brand Apotekarnes ("the Pharmacists"), and this brand was also used for the cola that replaced Coca-Cola. Apotekarnes Cola was distributed by Pripps (later merged into Carlsberg Sverige) until they got the license to produce Pepsi-Cola in Sweden.

== See also ==
- List of defunct consumer brands
