= Swivel (disambiguation) =

A swivel is a type of connection that allows for rotation.

Swivel may also refer to:

- Swivel chair, a chair that can spin around
- Swivel LCD, another name for an articulating screen
- Swivel lens, a lens that freely rotates while attached to a camera body
- Swivel seat, a seat that can spin 90° or 180° but can not move laterally unless it is mounted on a rail
- Fishing swivel
- Swivel gun
- Swivel (form), a type of mobile phone form factor
- Swivel (drill rig), a mechanical device used on a drilling rig
- DJ Swivel (born 1984), Canadian music producer and DJ
- "go swivel" an insult (derogatory, slang, vulgar)

== See also ==
- Swerve (disambiguation)
