= Kream Krunch =

Breakfast cereal made by Kellogg's

Kream Krunch was a breakfast cereal from Kellogg's that was created in 1965. The cereal consisted of freeze-dried strawberry, vanilla or orange ice cream pieces, as well as O-shaped oat pieces. The cereal's spokesperson was a character that had a scoop of ice cream for a head.

The cereal was discontinued the same year it was introduced.

== See also ==
- List of defunct consumer brands
