= Gerber Singles =

Defunct food product

Gerber's Singles

Gerber Singles was a failed product from 1974 by Gerber, a maker of baby food. It was food in glass jars targeted to college students and adults living on their own for the first time. One marketing tag line was "We were good for you then, we're good for you now." According to Business Insider, Gerber believed that there was a market for single serving, ready to eat foods similar to ready-made baby food. Hoping that college students and other adults would purchase such foods if they were not labeled as "baby food", Gerber developed the Singles product. According to Business Insider, the fatal flaw and the reason the product flopped is that "packages of meat mush didn't exactly scream 'cool' to young singles."

== See also ==
- List of defunct consumer brands
