= Jean Lassale =

Swiss watch company

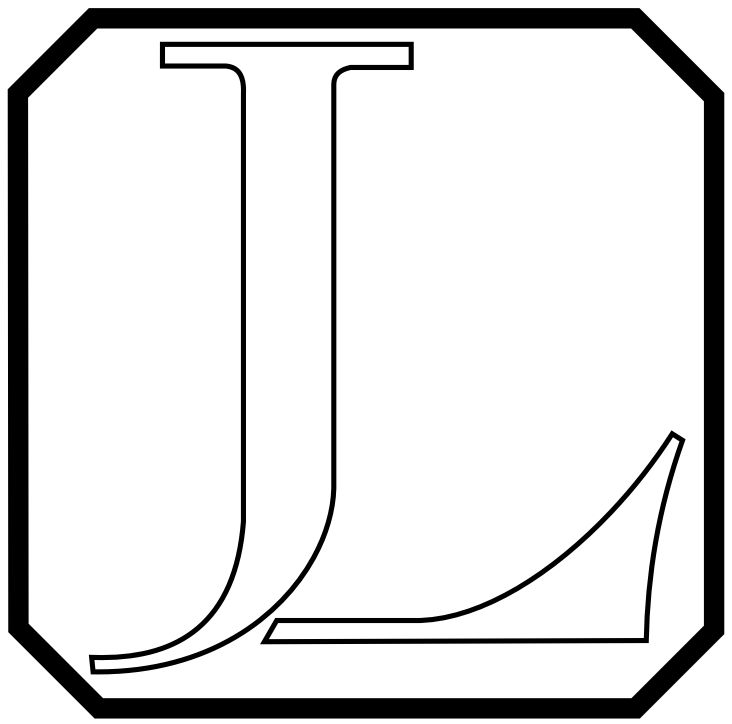
- Company type: Private
- Industry: Watch manufacturing
- Founded: 1976 by Jean Bouchet-Lassale
- Fate: Bankruptcy
- Headquarters: Geneva, Switzerland
- Key people: Jean Bouchet-Lassale, founder; Pierre Mathys, watchmaker
- Products: Prestige watches

Jean Lassale was a Swiss watch company that designed the Calibre 1200, featuring the thinnest mechanical watch movement: 1.2 mm. In the 1970s, Pierre Mathys, master watchmaker in La Chaux-de-Fonds, designed and built the prototype of a revolutionary watch caliber, with the goal of making the thinnest watch in the world. To achieve this feat, Mathys based his design on the work of Robert Annen, who previously had the idea of using ball bearings in small scale horology. Mathys decided to remove the bridges and counter-pivot, and instead use ball bearings for the axis.

== Company history ==
The company Bouchet-Lassale was founded by Jean Bouchet-Lassale on October 8, 1976. The company won several awards for its watches:

- Salon International des Inventions et des techniques nouvelles; Genève 1976 :
1. Médaille d'Or avec félicitations (Gold medal with congratulations)
2. Grand Prix de la ville de Genève
3. Prix de la Chambre Suisse de l'Horlogerie
- Salon Mondial des Inventions; Bruxelles December 1976 :
1. Grand Prix du Jury pour les innovations industrielles
2. Médaille d'Or (Gold Medal)
- Int'l Inventors Expo «77»; New York 4 March 1977 :
1. Gold Medal
2. Award of Honor
3. Award of Merit

In 1978-79, a collaboration starts between Bouchet-Lassale SA and Omega SA, through Lemania-Lugrin SA, L’Orient, which were both units of the SSIH Group (Société Suisse pour l’Industrie Horlogère, which does not exist anymore today). So, Lemania–Lugrin SA built calibres 1200 and 2000, Omega owning a non-exclusive license for the production and the sale of those movements.

In Septembre 79, Bouchet-Lassale SA met some financial difficulties, and the production was stopped. In December of the same year, Claude Burkhalter, then the director of Lemania-Lugrin SA, declares during an internal meeting that « Omega has the possibility to buy the Jean Lassale brand ». But Jean Lassale is bought by Seiko, while the technical documents and the patents are bought by Claude Burkhalter, at the same time as he creates the company « Nouvelle Lemania SA ». Founded in 1982, this company will continue the activities of Lemania-Lugrin SA, and it will produce from the beginning the successors of the calibers 1200 and 2000 : the calibers 1210 and 2010 Lemania. Those calibers will be sold exclusively to Piaget SA, as long as this company will stay independent. When Piaget went under the control of Cartier, this exclusivity was released, and Nouvelle Lemania SA could then sell the calibers to different watch companies, among them Vacheron Constantin.

At Vacheron, the Caliber 1200 is called 1160, and the automatic movement is called 1170.

The company Bouchet-Lassale filed some patents :

- Sealing Arrangement for an Extra-Flat Waterproof Watch Case. Filed on 10/11/1980. Designer : Pierre Goy. UK Patent GB 2 087 603 A. INT CL : G04B 37/11.
- Clasp for watch bracelet. Filled on 13/06/1983. Designer : Jean Bouchez. Swiss patent CH651729 (A5).

The Jean Lassale SA company was excluded from the Swiss Chamber of Commerce on 10 April 2006, following the bankruptcy that was declared by the Tribunal de Première Instance dated 23 June 2003. The company's last CEO was Mr Hagiwara Yasunori.

== The Calibre 1200 ==
The calibre 1200, with its automatic version the Calibre 2000, were first presented at the Foire Internationale de l’Horlogerie in Basel in April 1976. This mechanical, handwound movement has a diameter of 20.4 mm, and a thickness of 1.2 mm. There is an automatic version which is 2.08 mm thick). It holds 14 ball-bearings. Each one uses 0.20 mm balls. These ball-bearings are inserted in a platine which is 1.2 mm thin. Its frequency is 21,600 Alt/H, and its power reserve is 35 hours. It has 11 jewels. The calibre 1200 (and its automatic version 2000) were built from 1976 to 1979 in the factory that the company Bouchet-Lassale SA had built on 30, rue des Voisins in Geneva, Switzerland. The gold cases came from the « Ateliers réunis », a company also located in Geneva.

The patent for this watch movement was applied in Switzerland on 1976, February 18. It was then applied in the USA on January 2, 1979 under the code US4132061A. The Abstract of the patent is :

An extra-thin manually or automatically wound watch movement in which at least one wheel is pivoted in an overhang position by means of a single-race miniaturized ball bearing.

== Robert Annen and the ball bearing ==
Robert Annen was a Swiss engineer who filed about 75 patents linked to horology and aeronautics, but not only. Some on his own name, some under the names of companies like "ROULEMENTS A BILLES MINIATURES", "LOUIS MULLER ET CIE S A FABRIQUE", "PARECHOC SA [CH]; ROCHAT FRERES S A". For the company "ROULEMENTS A BILLES MINIATURES" (Miniature Ball Bearing), he applied 17 patents. A list of his patents includes :

- BALL OR ROLLER BEARING (for LOUIS MULLER ET CIE), 30/06/1936
- ANNULAR BALL BEARING (for LOUIS MULLER ET CIE), 31/12/1935
- BALL BEARING (for LOUIS MULLER ET CIE), 04/06/1935
- AIRCRAFT PILOTAGE CONTROL DEVICE (on his own name), 16/11/1943
- Gyroscope indicateur du nord géographique (on his own name), 30/06/1968
- METHOD OF DRILLING HARD MATERIALS (for PARECHOC SA; ROCHAT FRERES SA), 03/06/1969
- Palier à roulement (for ROULEMENTS A BILLES MINIATURES), 30/06/1956
- Oil-sealed shaft bearing (for ROULEMENTS A BILLES MINIATURES), 07/09/1954
- Sealing device for antifriction bearings (for ROULEMENTS A BILLES MINIATURES), 15/08/1956
- Ball bearing for winding rockers in self-winding watch and clock movements (for ROULEMENTS A BILLES MINIATURES), 17/08/1954
- Device for pivotally mounting the winding weight of a self-winding mechanism in movements for timepieces (for ROULEMENTS A BILLES MINIATURES), 25/05/1954
- Ball bearing (for ROULEMENTS A BILLES MINIATURES), 09/11/1943
- Ball bearing for rotor shafts (for ROULEMENTS A BILLES MINIATURES), 07/03/1939

== Examples of Jean Lassale watches ==
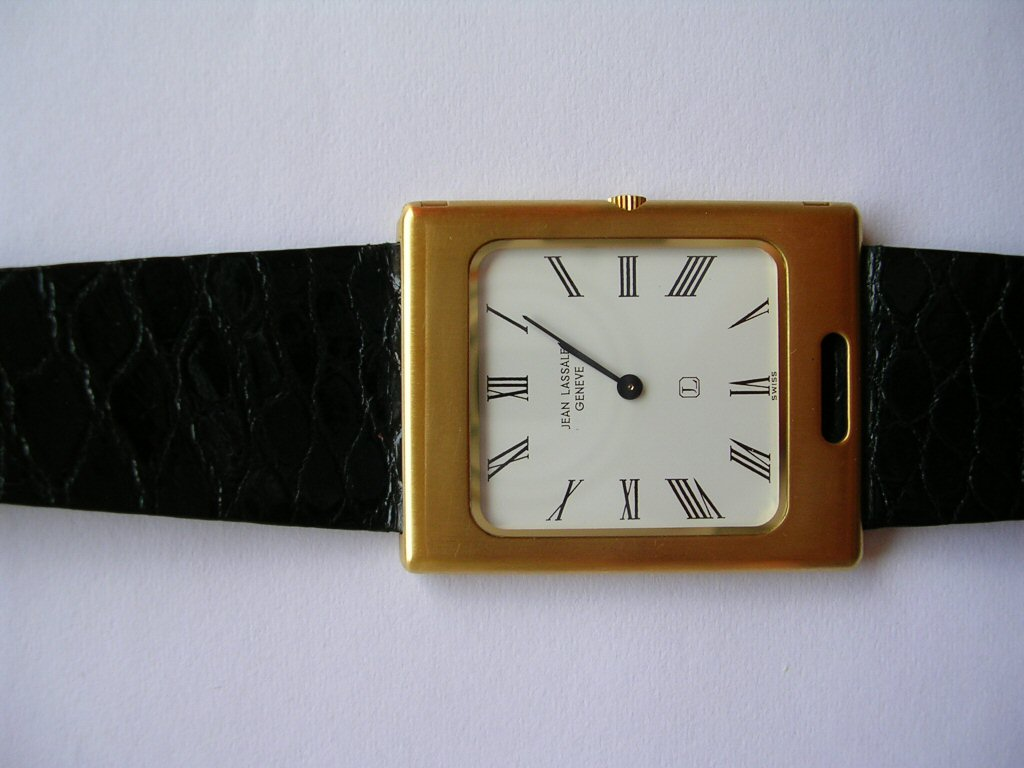
This watch can transform into a table clock.

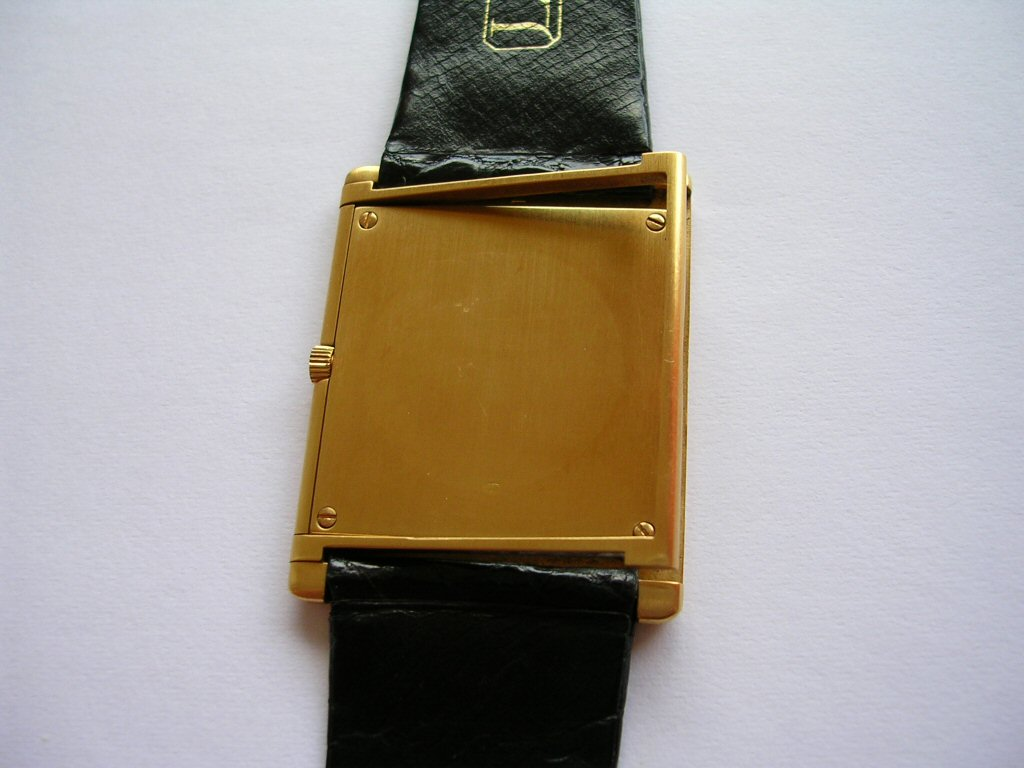
View of the back of the watch

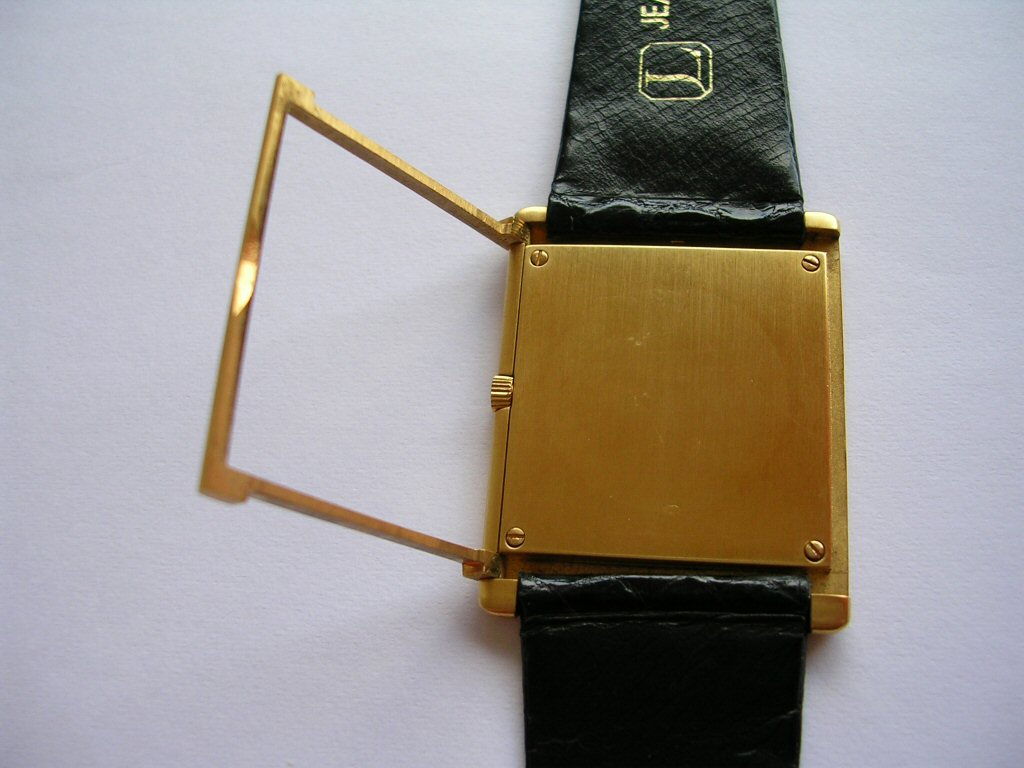
Transformation from a wristwatch to a clock in progress

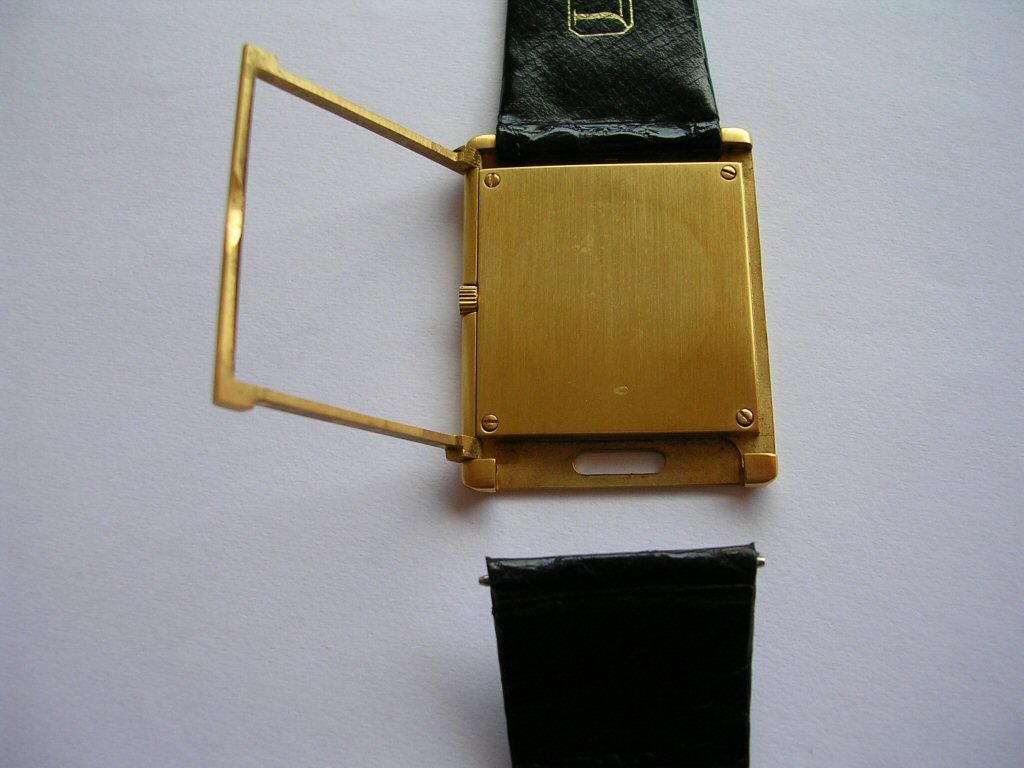
Remove the bottom band

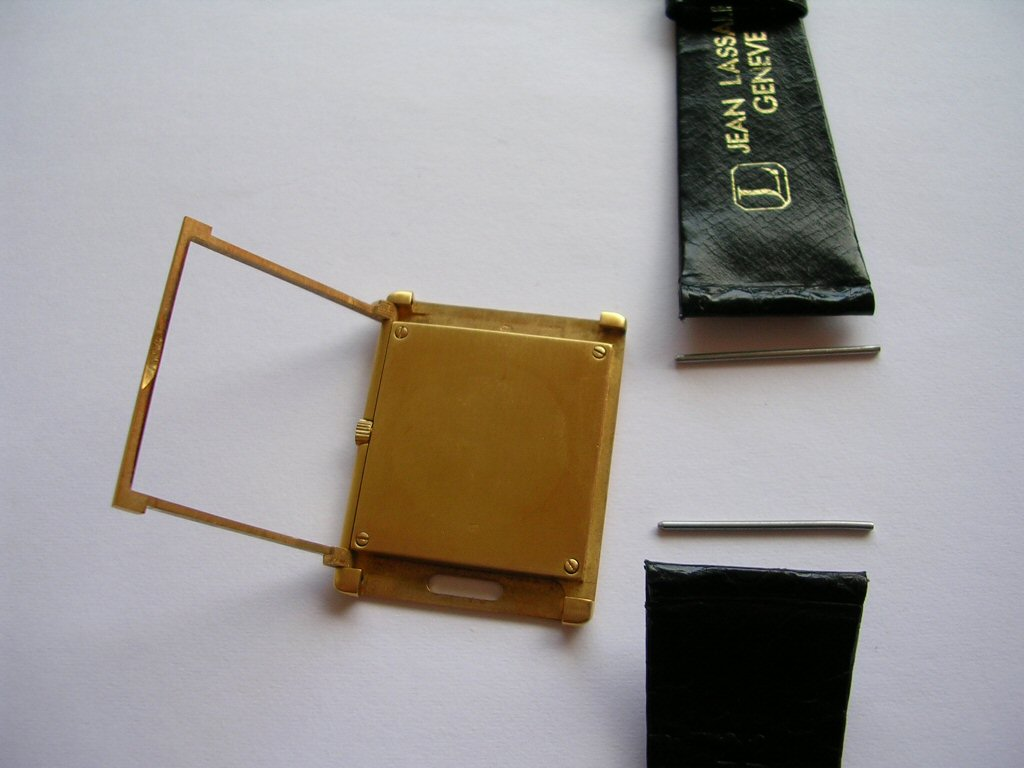
Both bands removed.

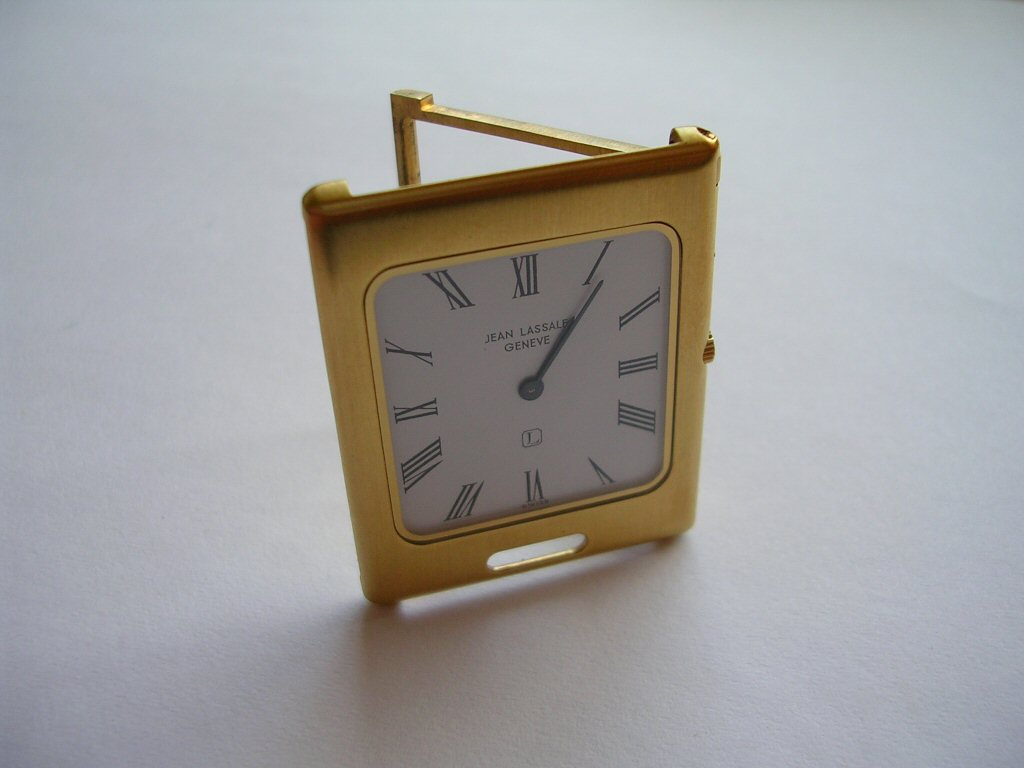
The Jean Lassale table clock

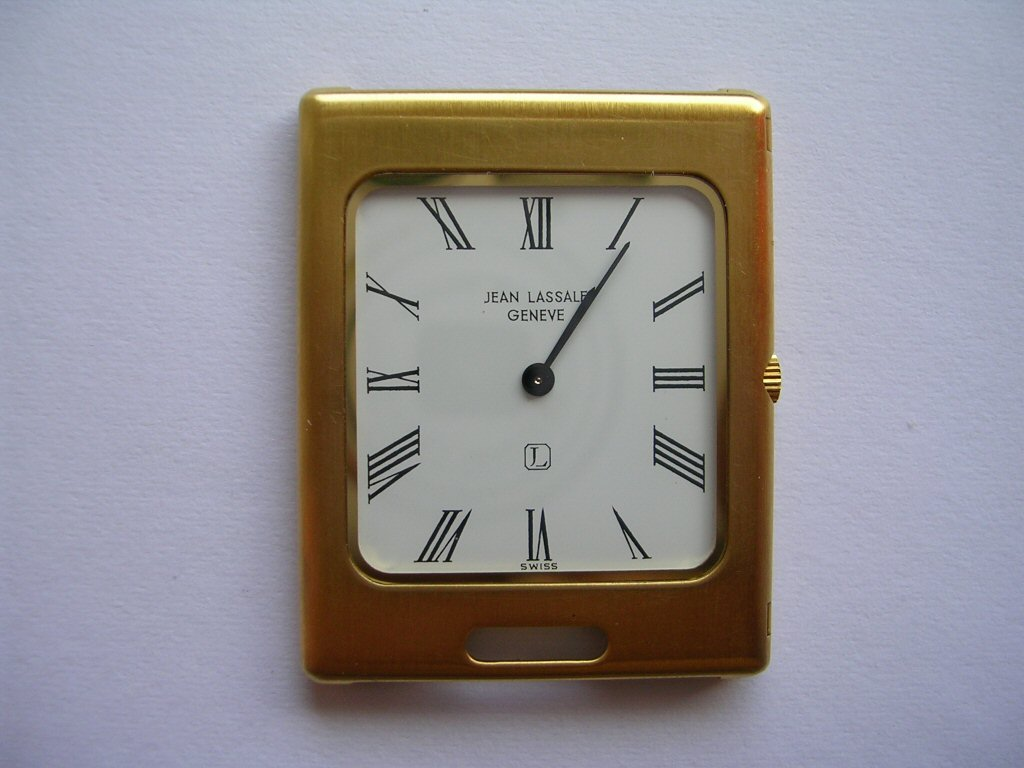
Front view

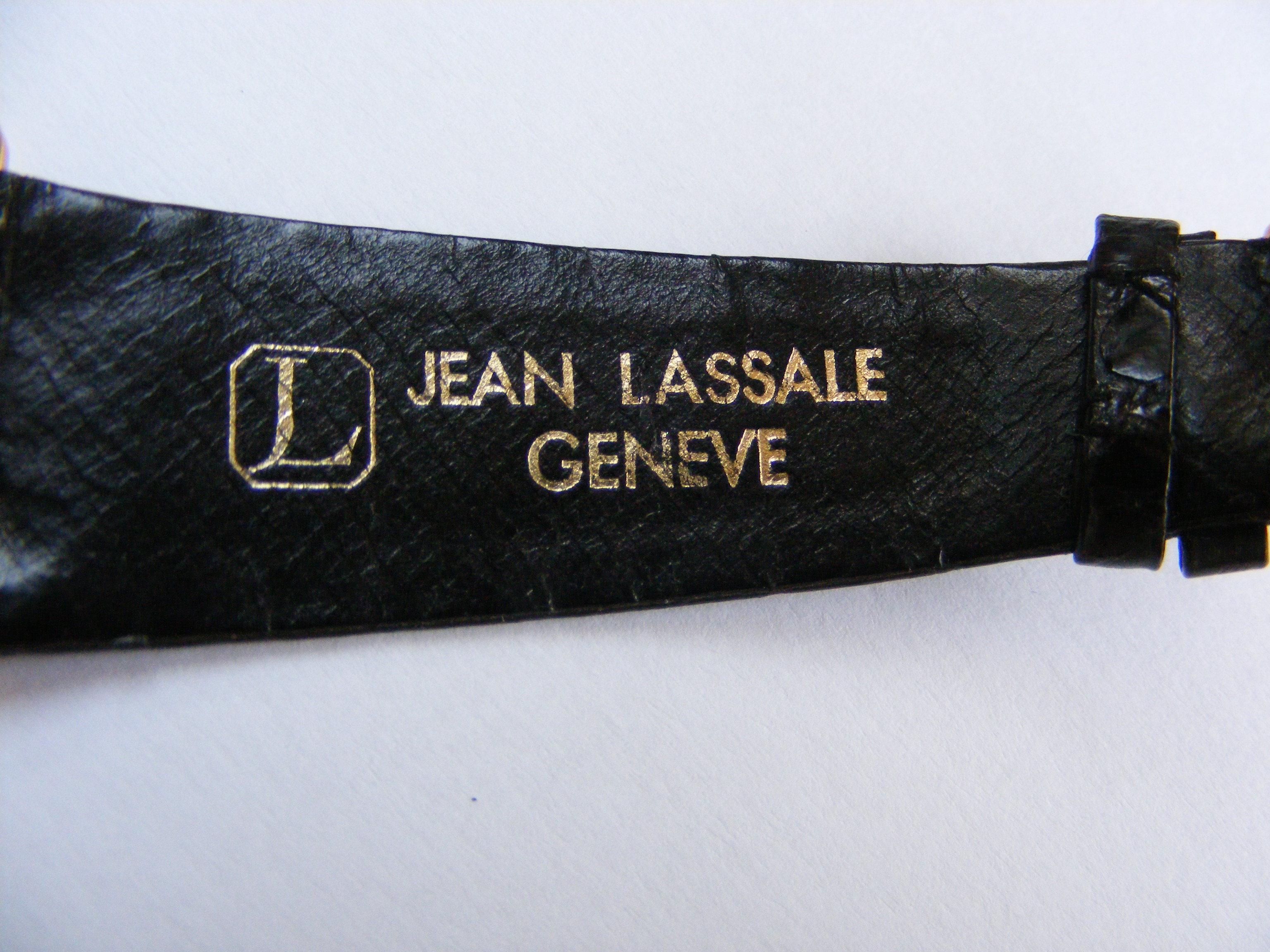
Watch band

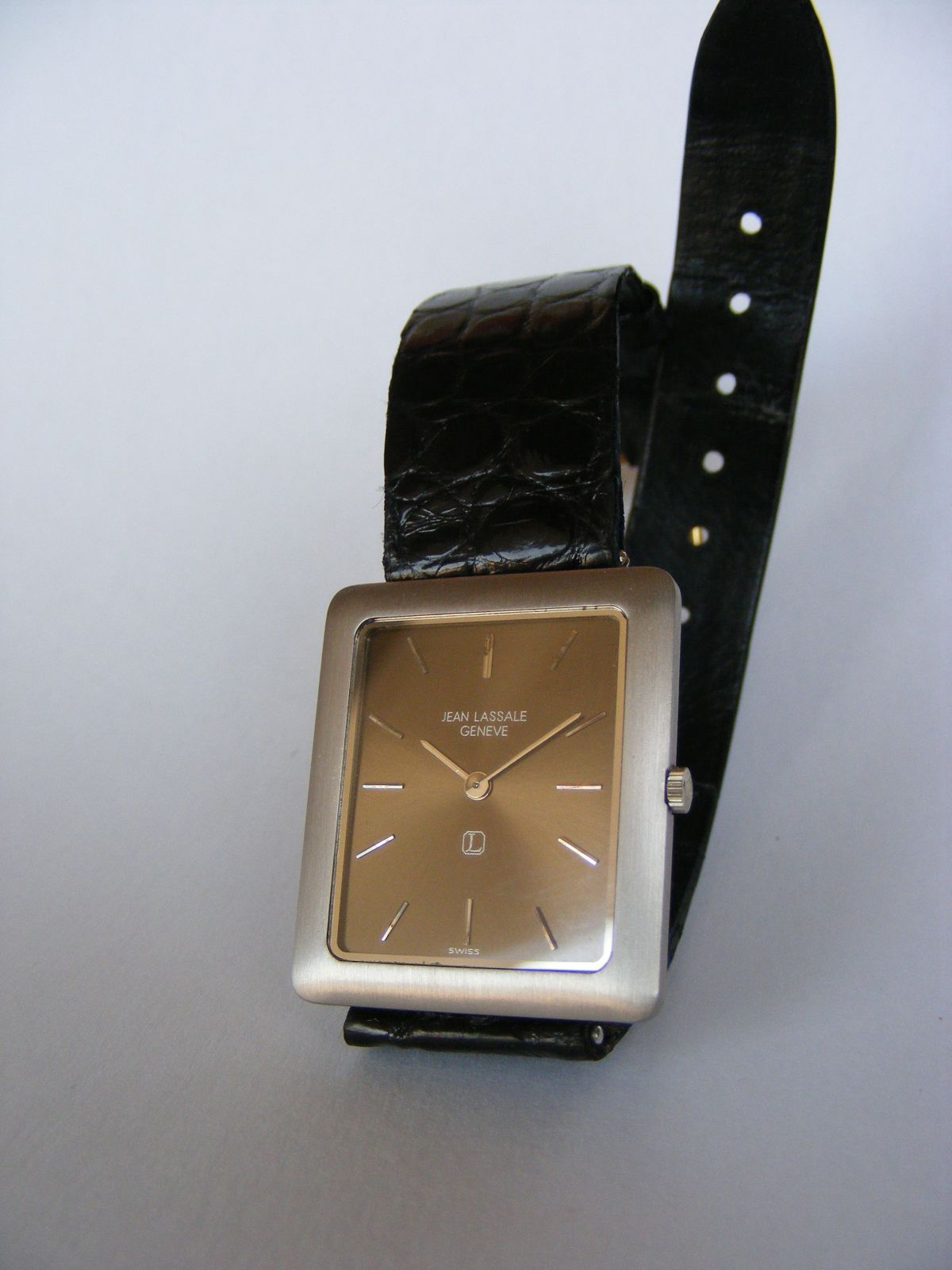
White Gold (calibre 1200)

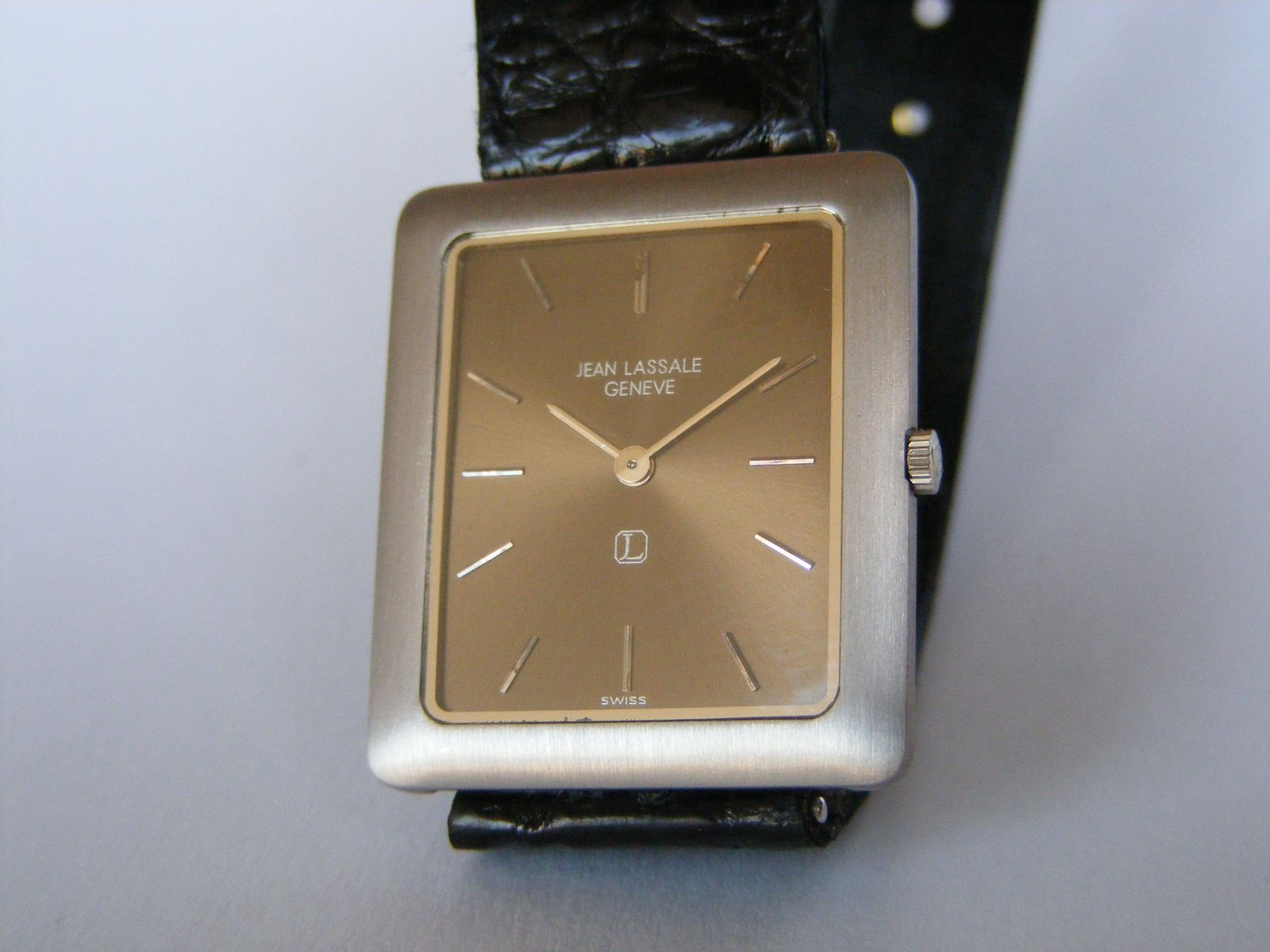

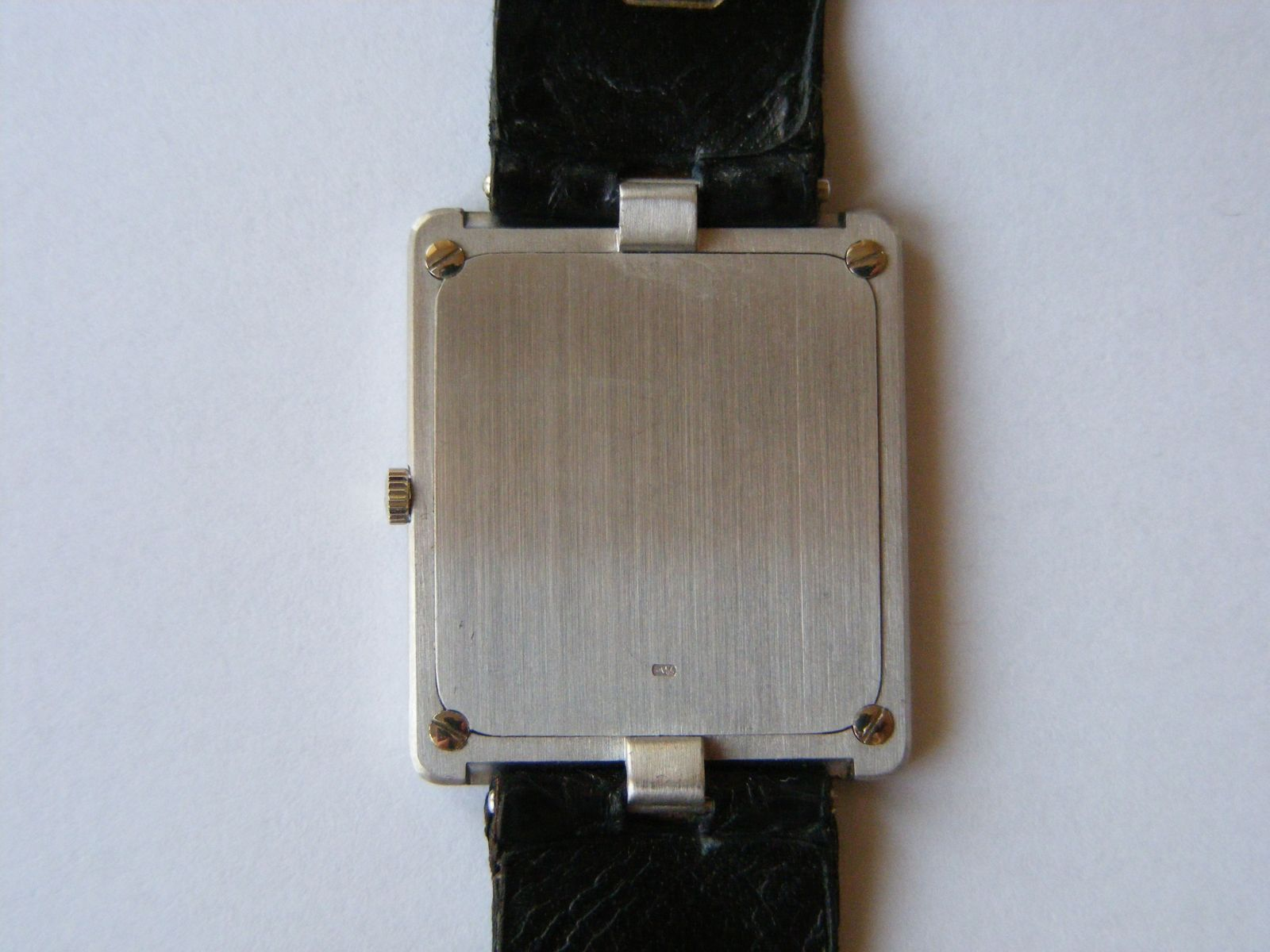
Back of watch

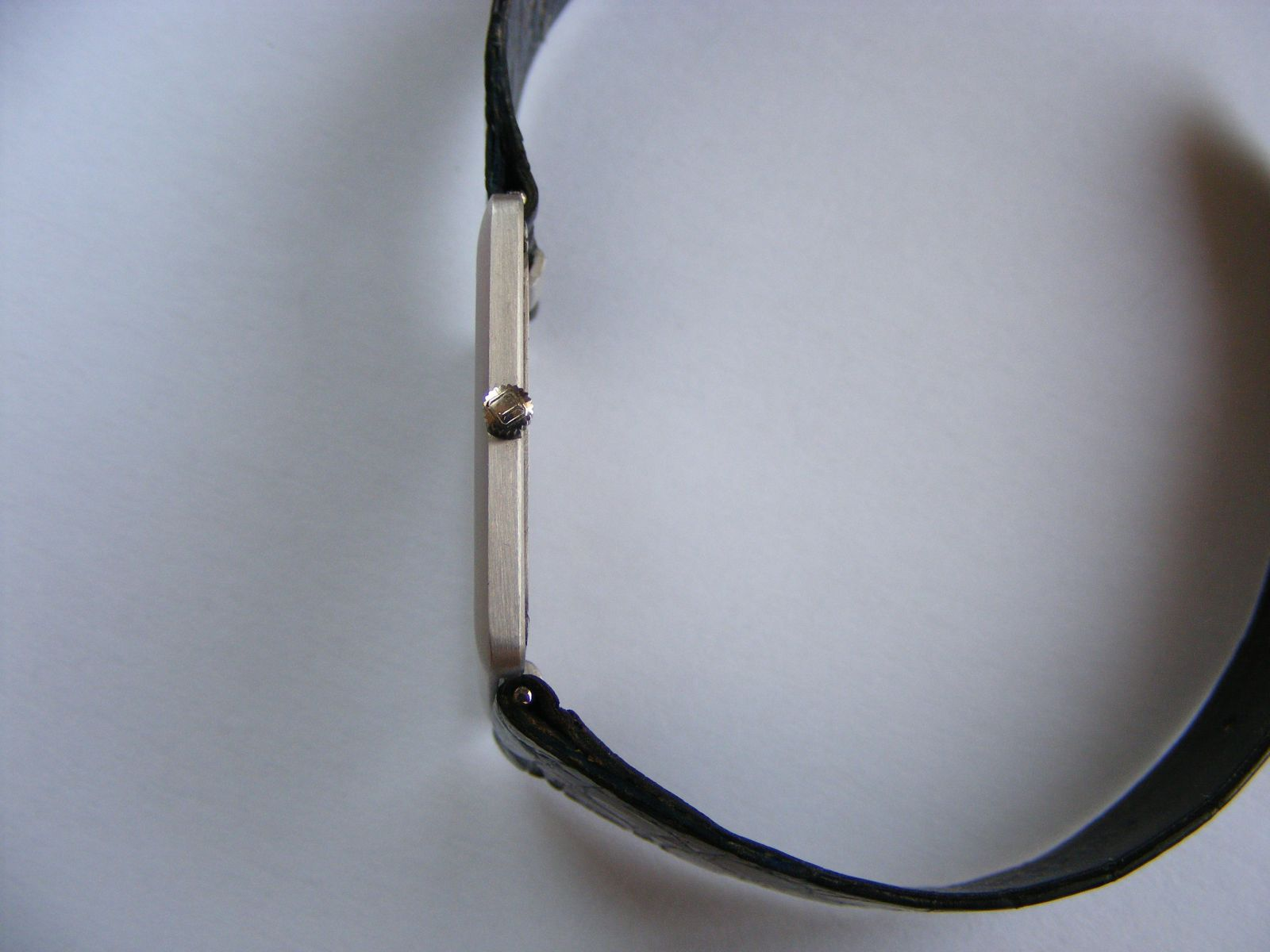
Side view

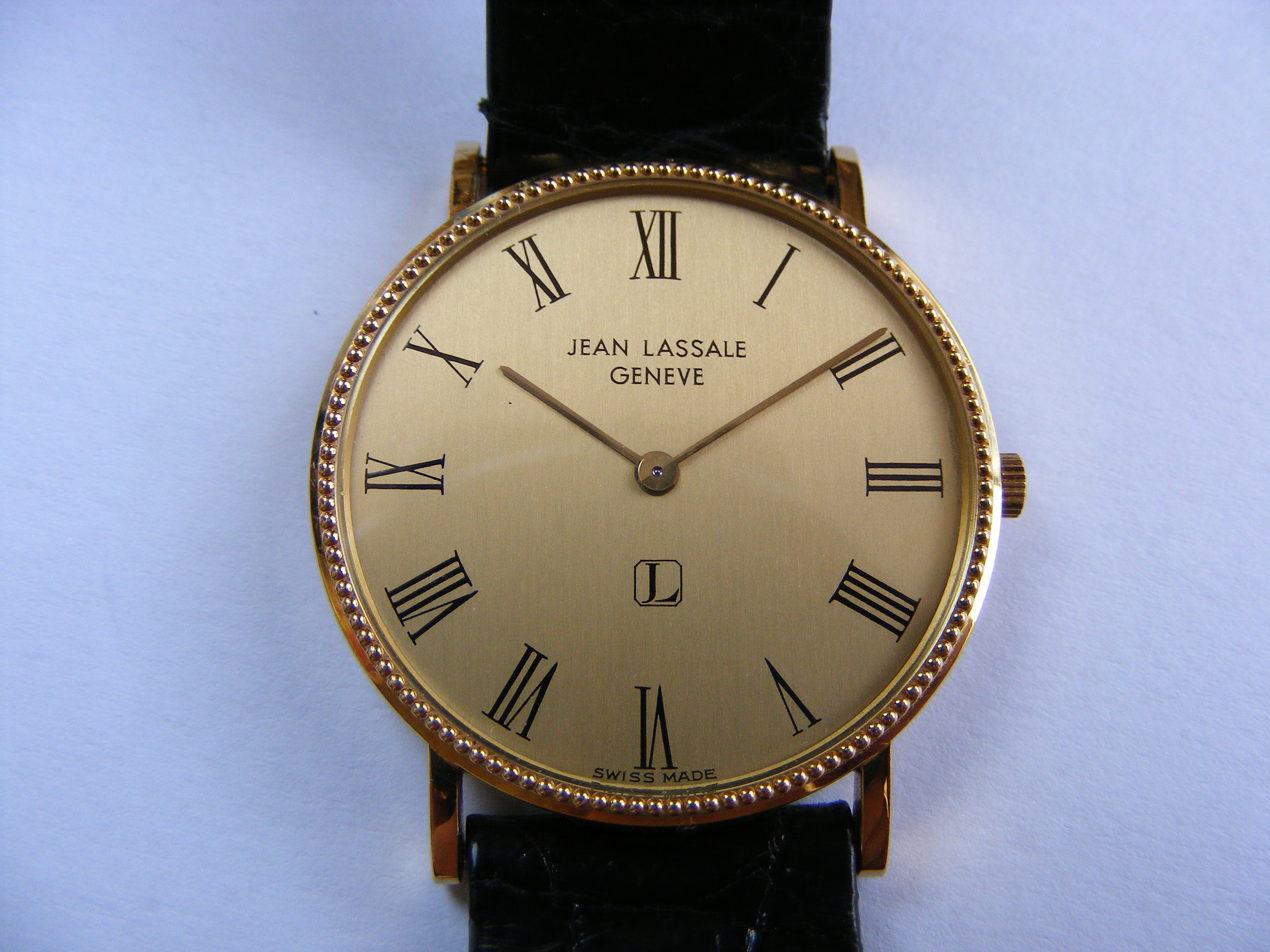
Yellow Gold; transparent case back.

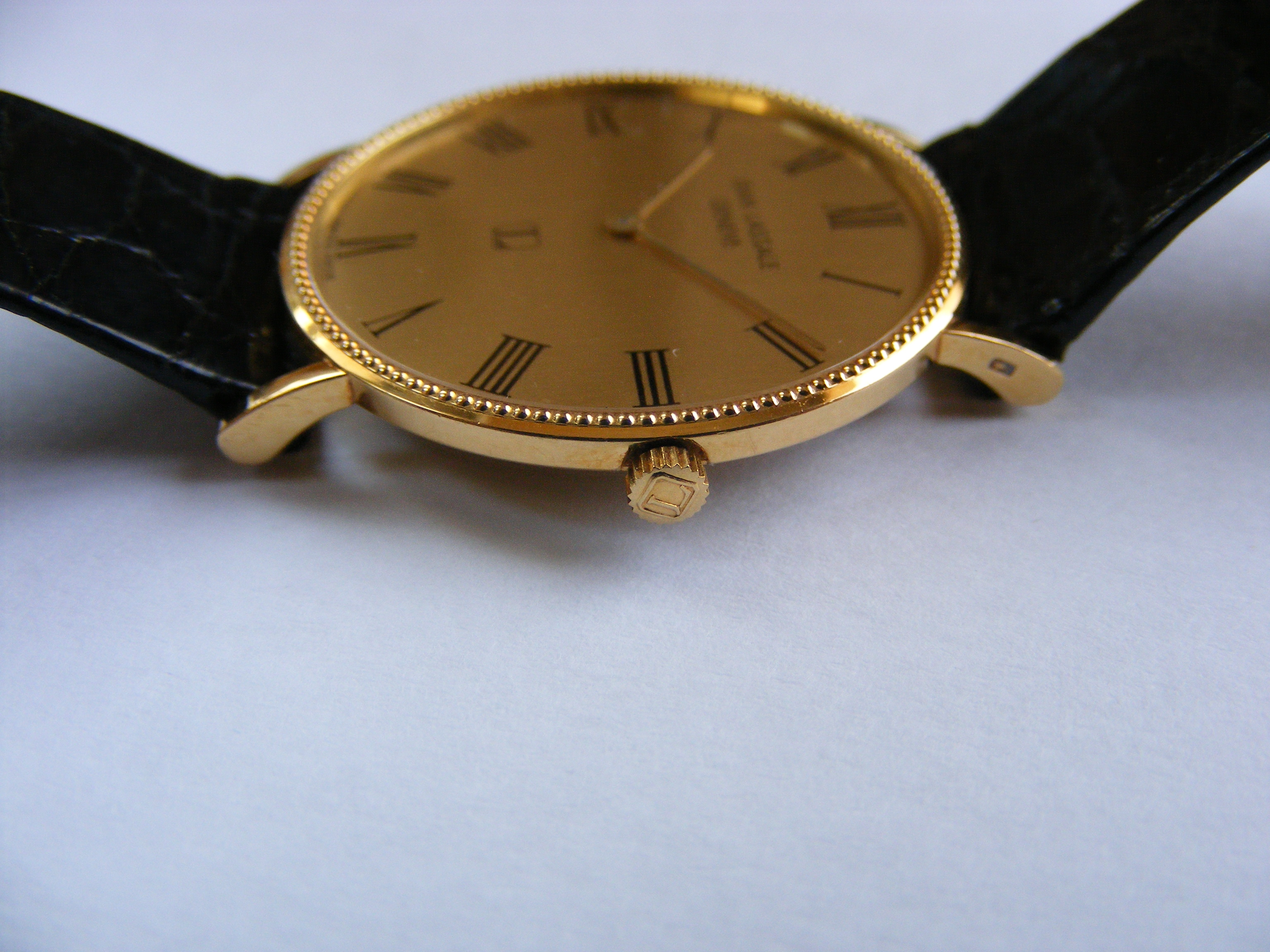

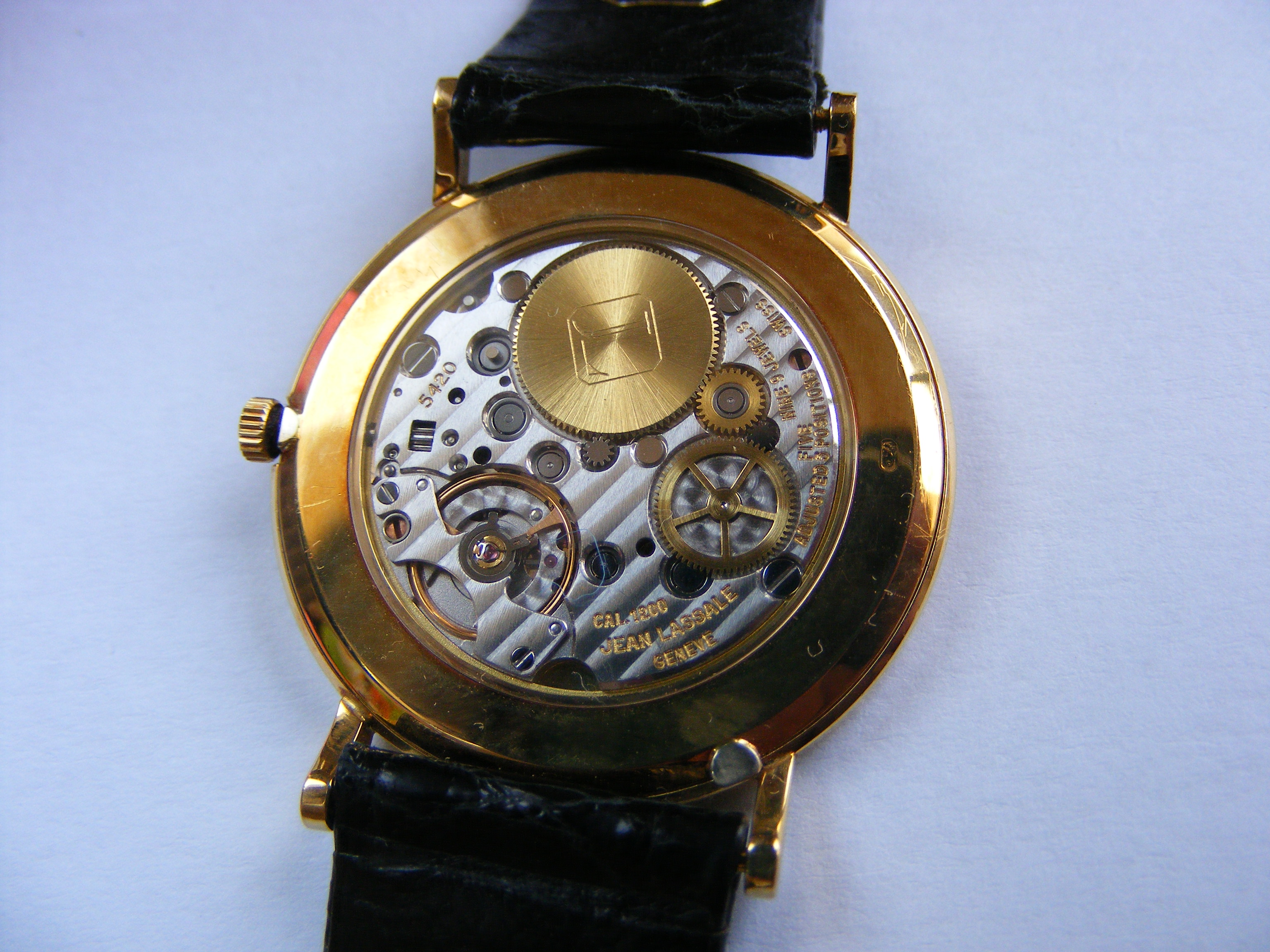

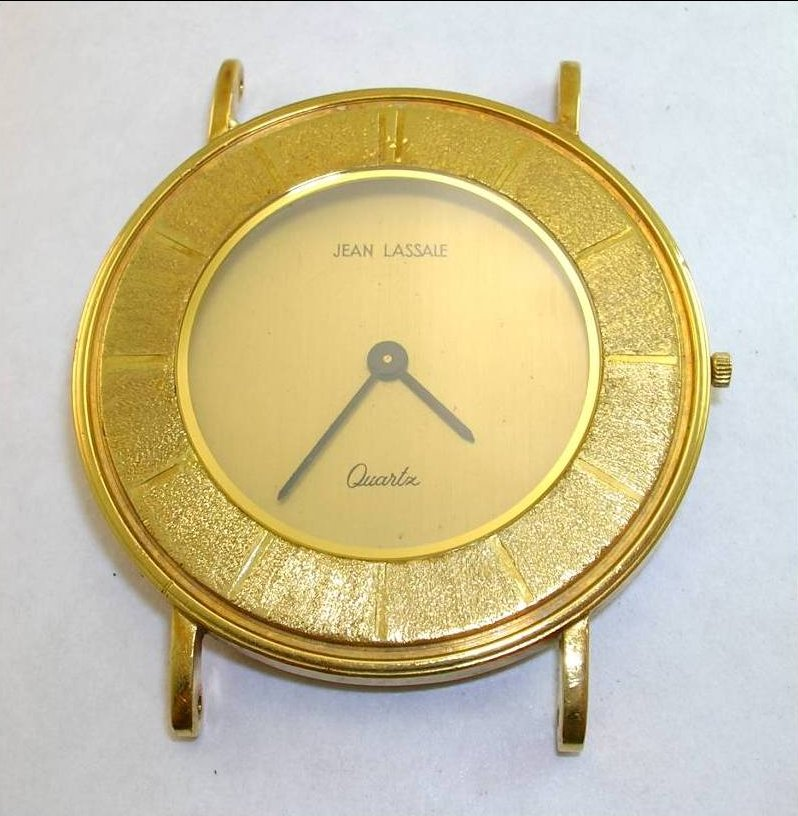
A Jean Lassale Quartz watch

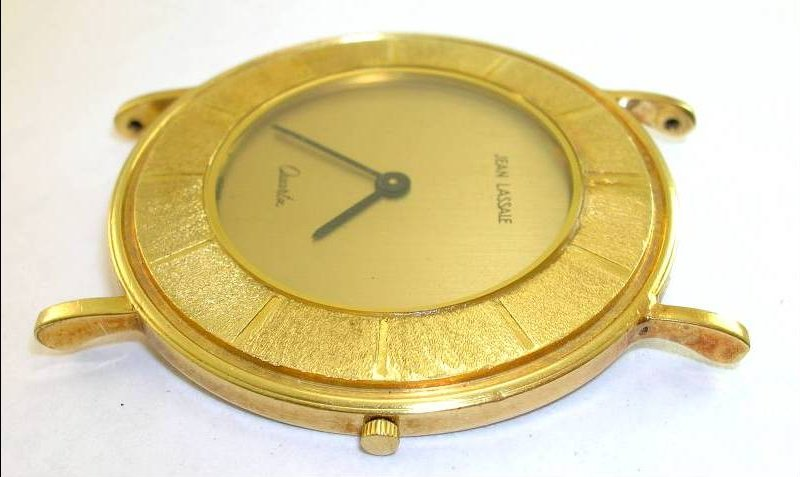

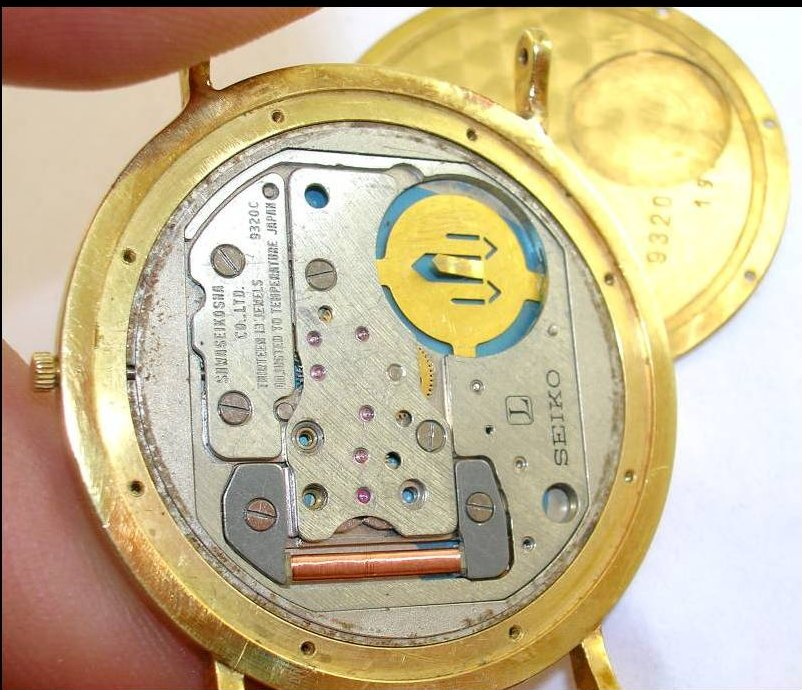
The quartz movement

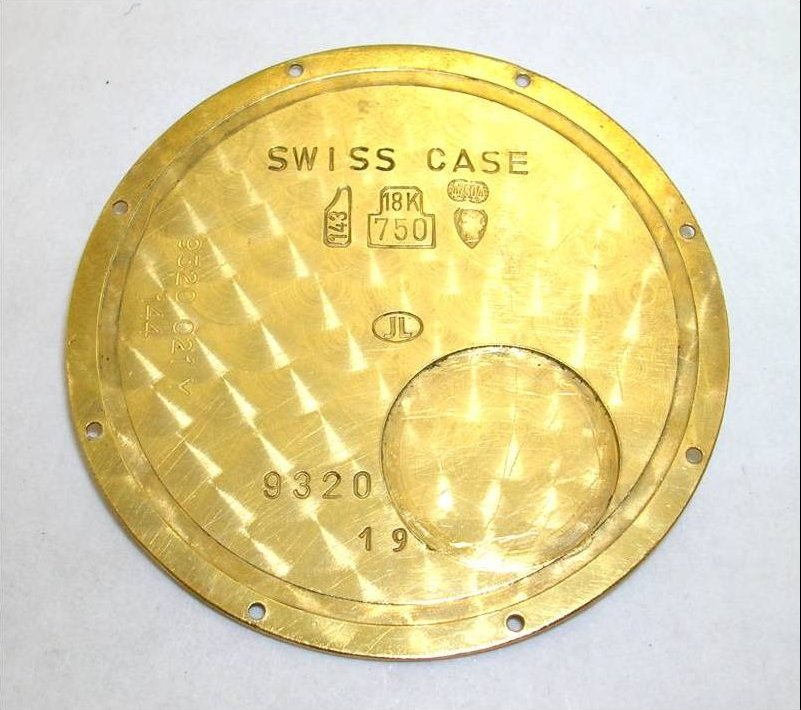

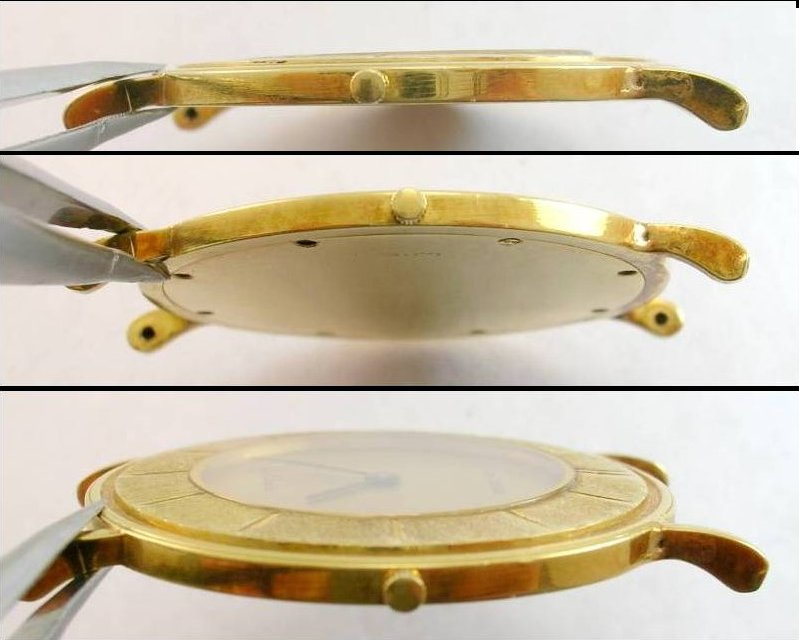

== Pictures of the Jean Lassale Calibers ==
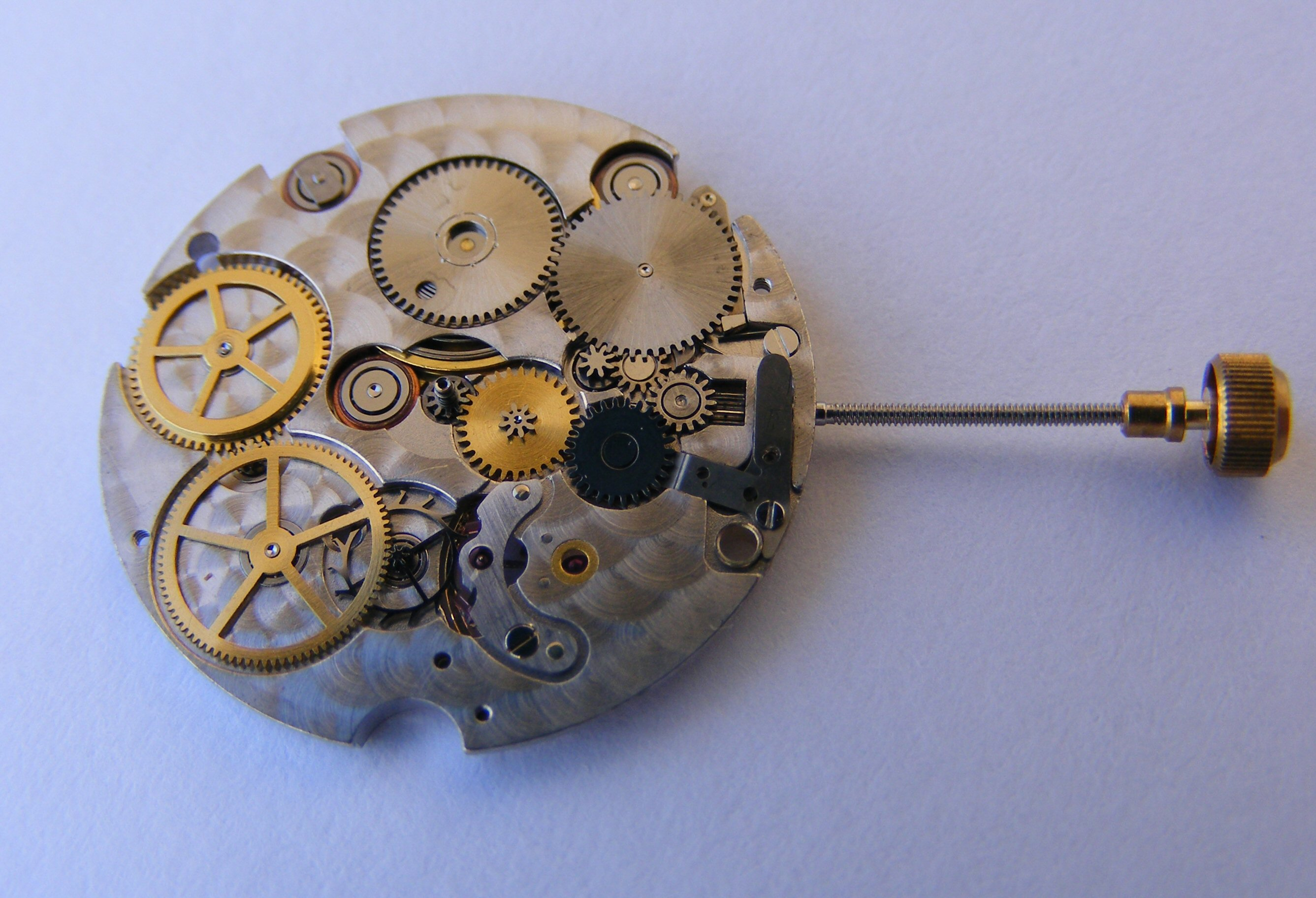
Calibre 1200 (Front)

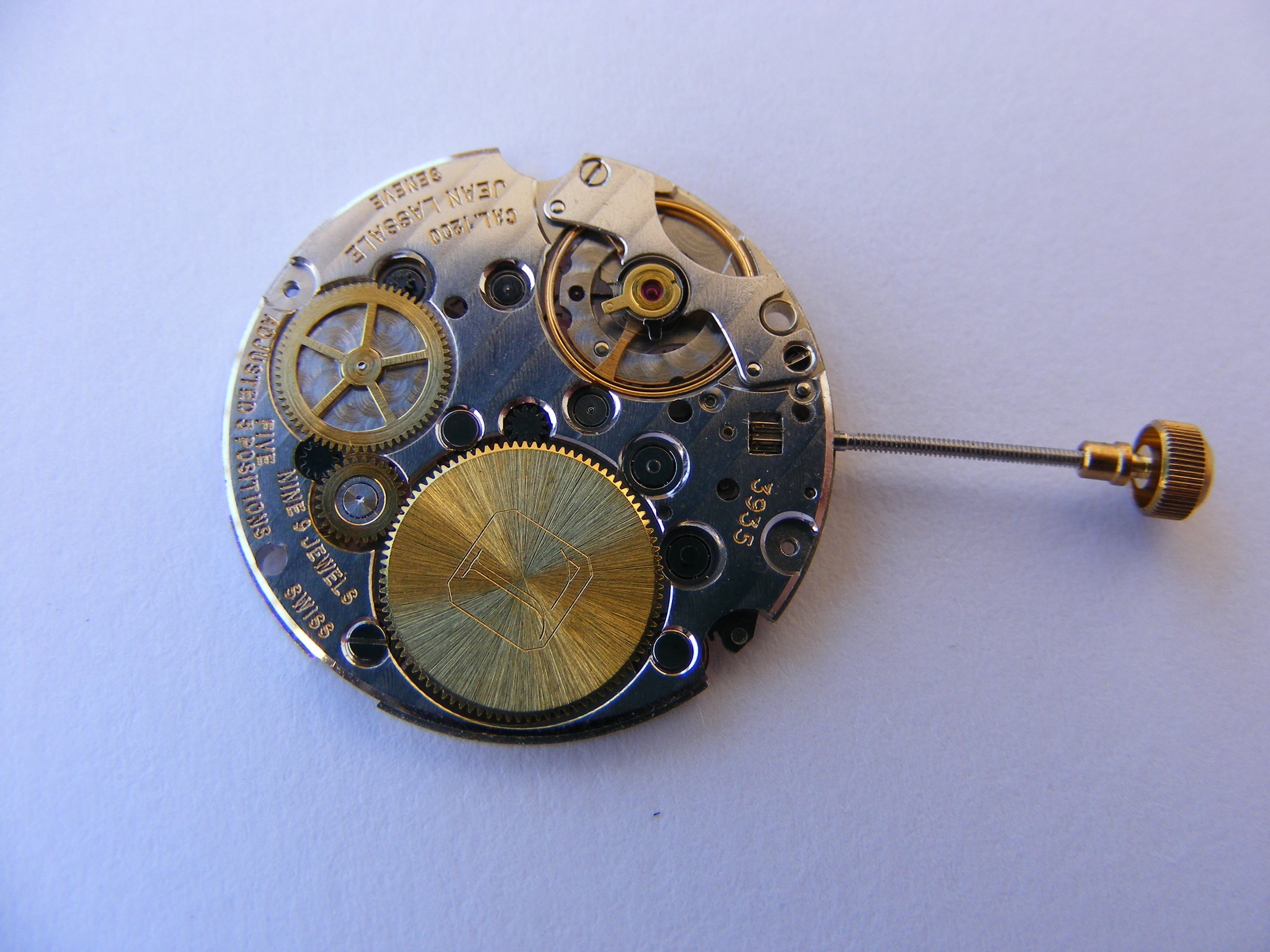
Calibre 1200 (Back)

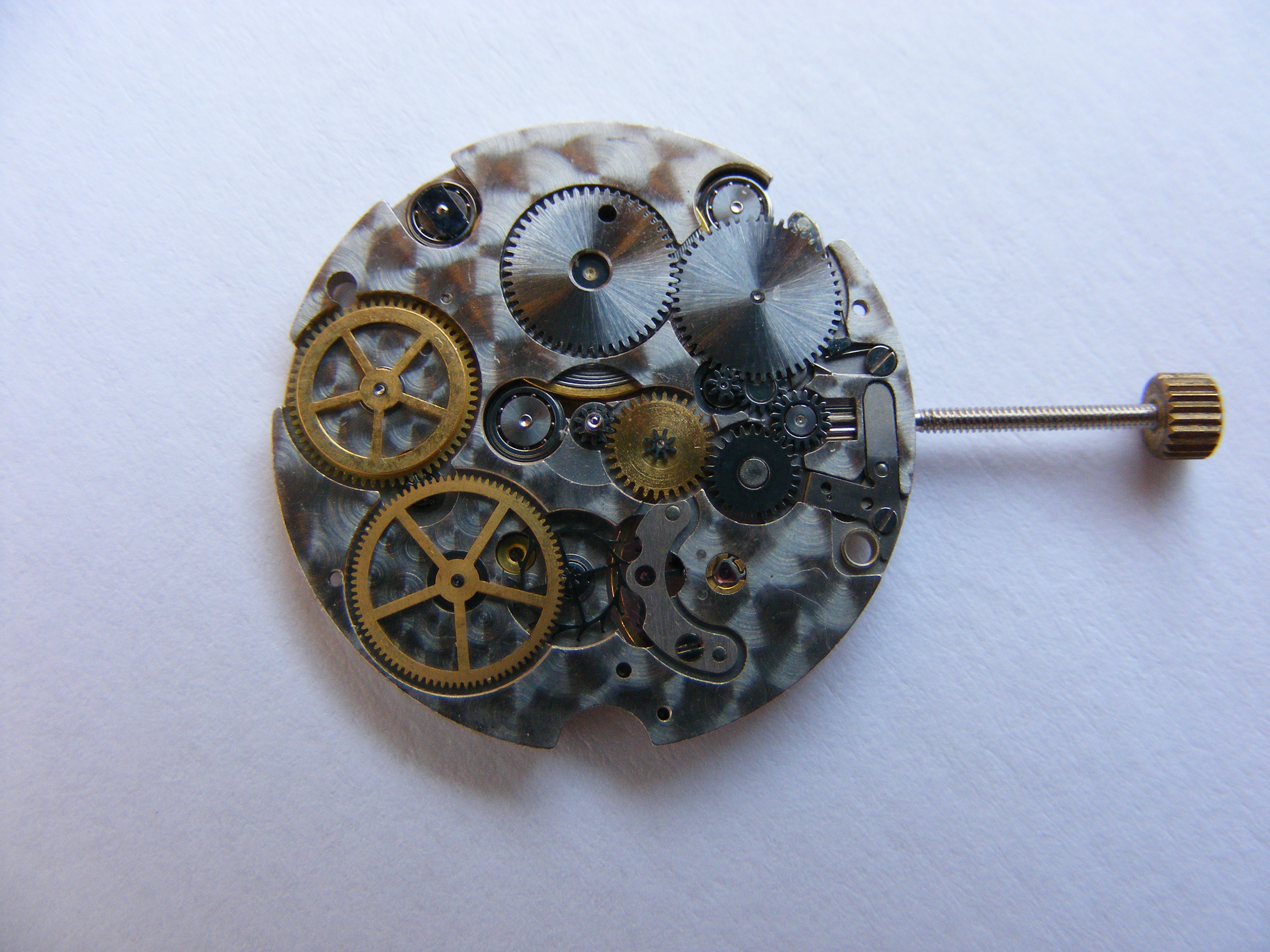
Calibre 2000 (Front)

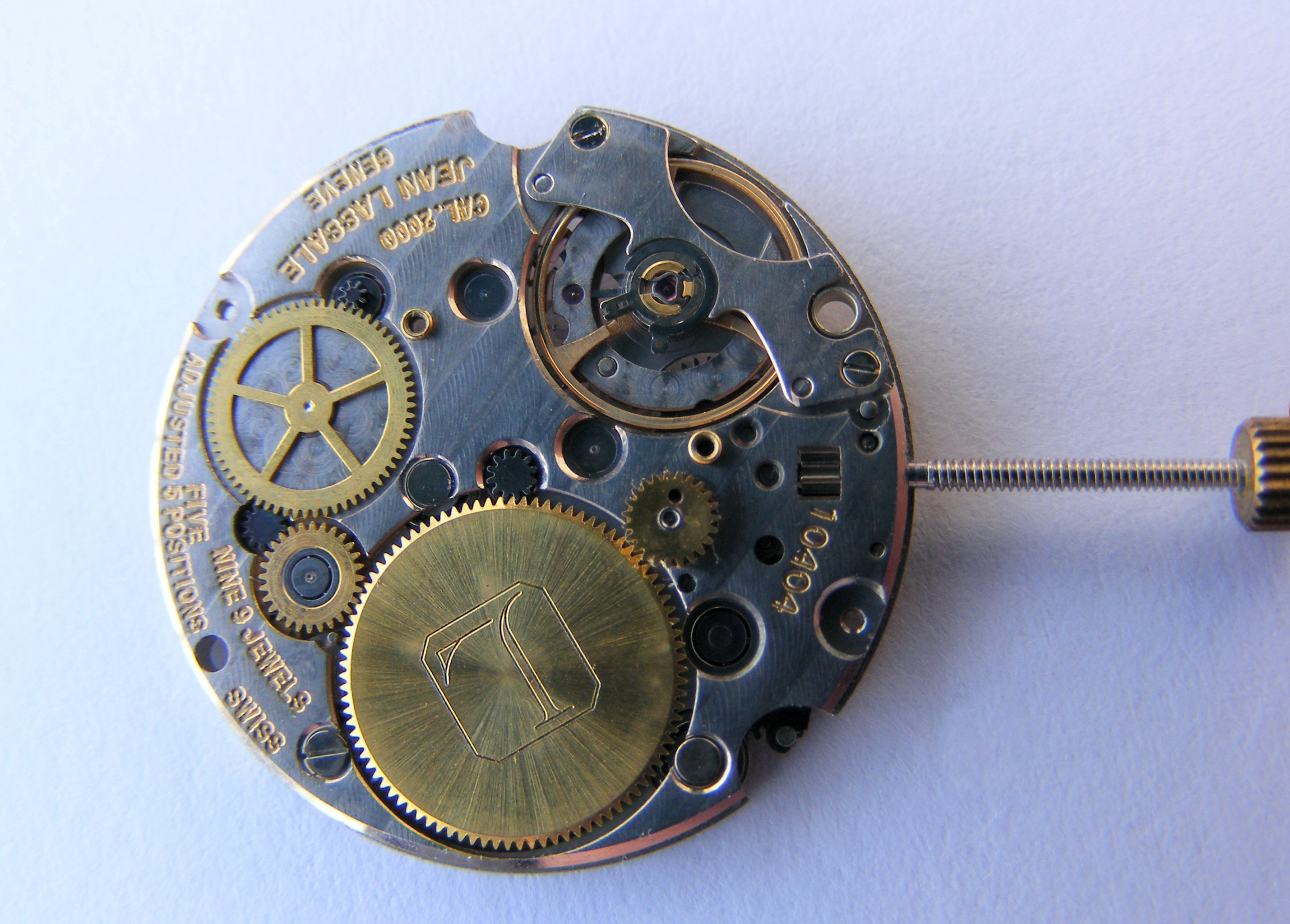
Calibre 2000 (Back, with automatic plate removed !)

== See also ==
- List of defunct consumer brands
