= Aspen Soda =

Discontinued apple-flavored soda by PepsiCo

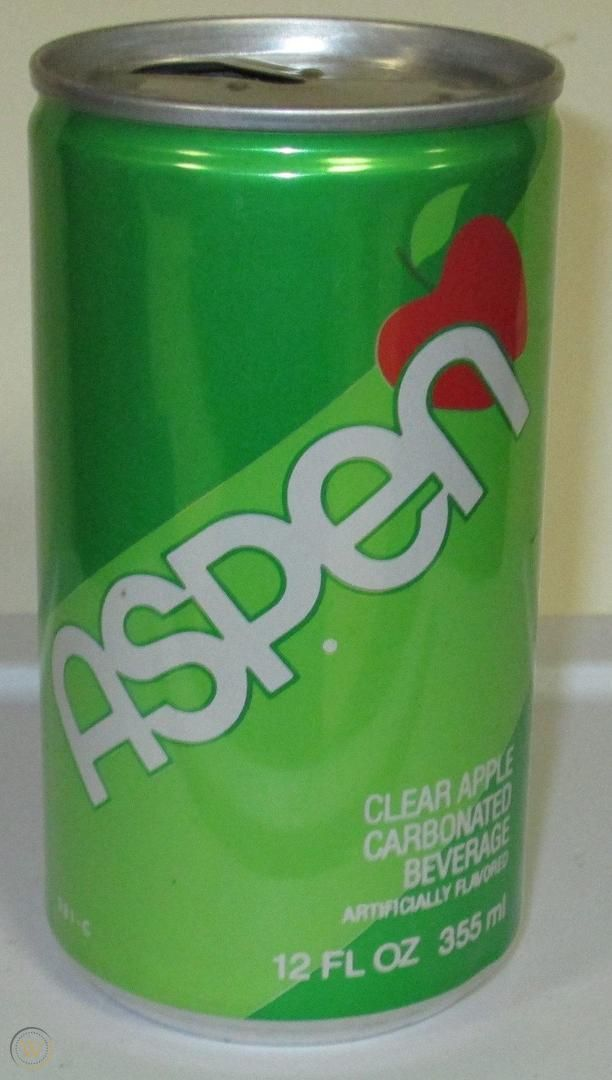
- Type: Soft Drink
- Manufacturer: PepsiCo, Inc.
- Origin: United States
- Introduced: 1978
- Discontinued: 1982
- Related products: Apple Slice, Manzana Mia

Aspen Soda was a clear, apple-flavored soft drink sold across the United States by PepsiCo from 1978 until 1982. In 1984, PepsiCo came out with a replacement apple soda under its new Slice line.

== See also ==
- List of defunct consumer brands
