= List of defunct consumer brands =

This is a list of defunct notable consumer brands that are no longer manufactured and no longer available to consumers. According to the Cambridge Dictionary, a consumer brand is "a product that is well known and that is bought by individual people rather than by companies". Brands in this list may still be manufactured in modest quantities or limited runs as a nostalgic or retro style item. The items in the list are mainly American.

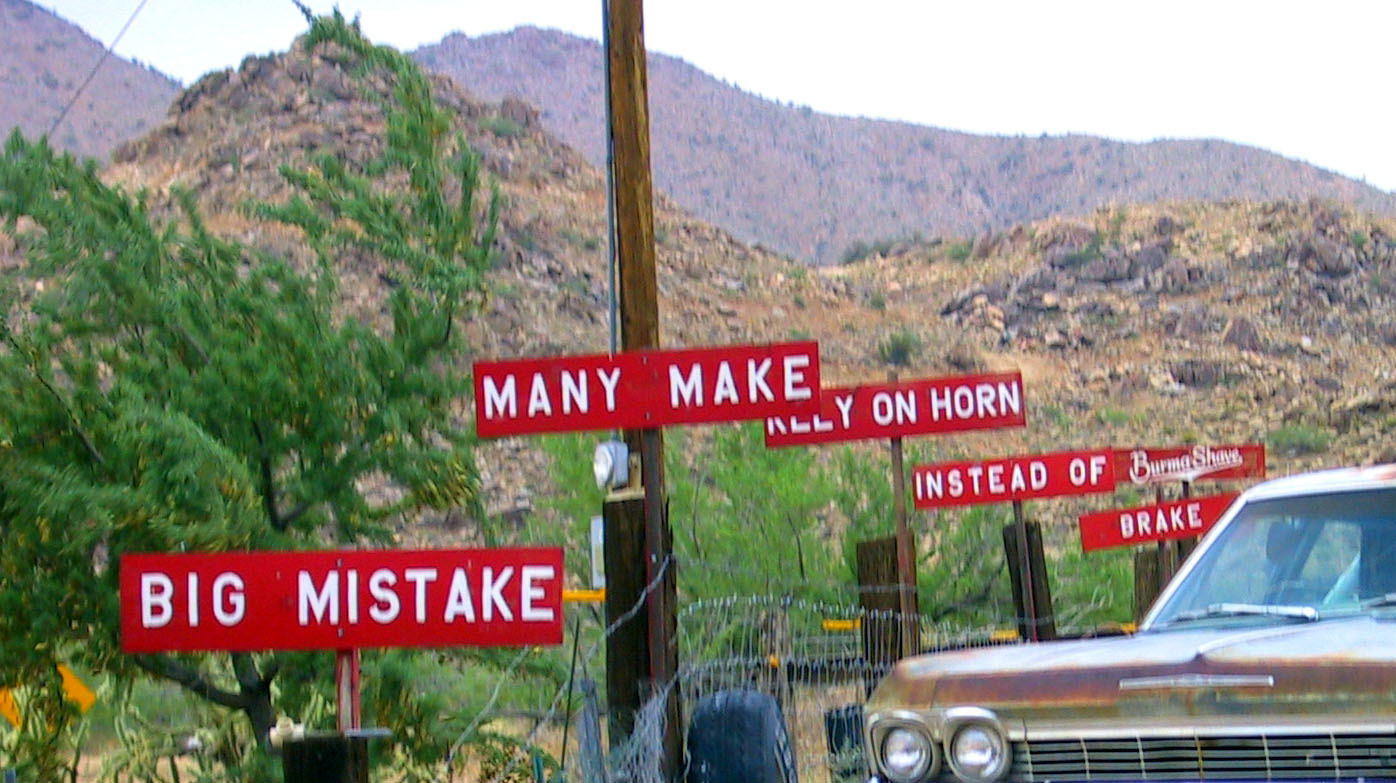
A set of signs promoting Burma-Shave, on U.S. Route 66

== Automobiles ==
- American Motors
- Austin
- Checker Motors Corporation
- Cole Motor Car Company
- Dadi Auto
- Daewoo Motors
- DeLorean Motor Company
- De Soto
- De Tomaso
- Edsel
- Essex
- Facel Vega
- Gurgel Motores
- Hispano-Suiza
- Holden
- Hudson Motor Car Company
- Jensen Motors
- King Midget
- LaSalle
- Leyland Motors
- Matra
- Mercury
- Oldsmobile
- Packard
- Plymouth
- Pontiac
- Saab
- Saturn Corporation
- Simca
- Stanley Motor Carriage Company
- Studebaker
- Stutz Motor Car Company
- Thunderbird
- Talbot
- Trabant
- Wartburg
- Xiali
- Xinkai
- Yellow Cab Company

== Banking and accounting ==
- Arthur Andersen
- Barnett Bank
- Bank One Corporation
- BBVA USA
- Bear Stearns
- Commerce Bancorp
- Crocker National Bank
- Drexel Burnham Lambert
- First Bank System
- Fleet Bank
- Golden West Financial
- Lehman Brothers
- National City Corp.
- Northern Rock
- TCF Financial Corporation
- Wachovia
- Washington Mutual

== Energy ==
- Clark Brands
- Enron
- Gulf Oil
- Sohio
- Texaco

== Food and beverages ==
=== Processing, distributing and retail companies ===
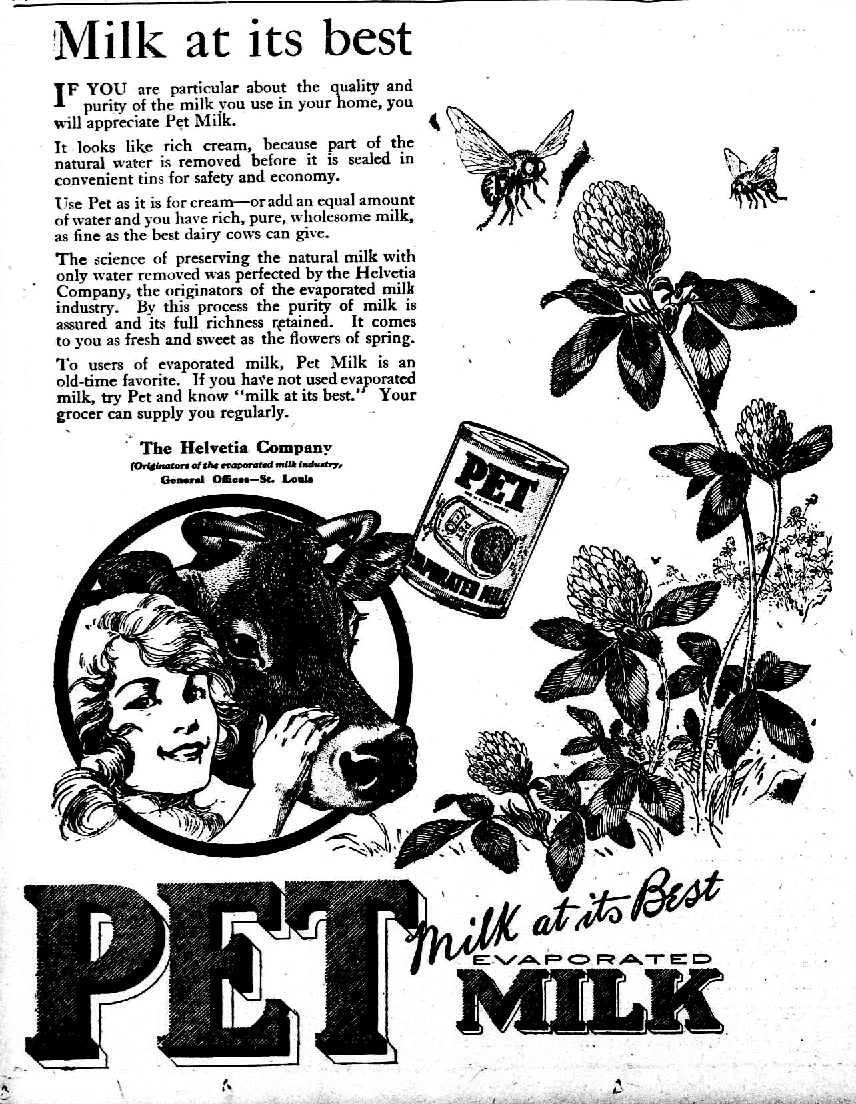
A PET milk advertisement from 1922

- Beatrice Foods
- Bill Knapp's
- Blue Valley Creamery Company
- Borden, Inc.
- Burger Chef
- Freezer Queen
- Pet, Inc.
- Revco
- Sexton Foods
- ShowBiz Pizza Place
- White Tower Hamburgers

=== Dairy ===
- Golden Guernsey
- Louis Trauth Dairy
- Swerve

=== Pet food ===
- Ken-L Ration
- Ralston Purina

=== Food items ===
- Arch Deluxe
- Certs
- Gerber Singles

=== Alcoholic beverages ===
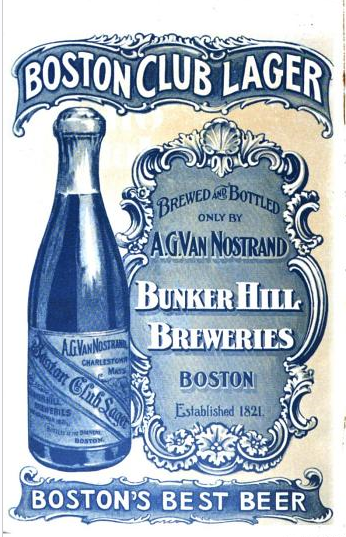
An advertisement for Bunker Hill Breweries' Boston Club Lager

- Abner-Drury Brewery
- $1,000 Beer
- Ashland Beer
- Atherton Whiskey
- Braumeister Beer
- Billy Beer
- Boston Club Lager
- California Cooler
- Chief Oshkosh Beer
- Cream City Beer
- Falk Beer
- Falstaff Beer
- Gipfel Union Beer
- Goebel Beer
- Jung Beer
- Krug Beer
- Metz Beer
- Obermann Beer
- Pfaff's Beer
- Storz Beer
- Walter's Beer
- Willow Springs Sour Mash Whiskey

=== Breakfast cereals ===
- C3PO's Cereal
- Crazy Cow
- Crispy Critters
- Cröonchy Stars
- Fruit Brute
- Halfsies
- Ice Cream Cones
- Kaboom
- King Vitaman
- Kream Krunch
- Morning Funnies
- Nerds Cereal
- Nintendo Cereal System
- Post Toasties
- Product 19
- Quake
- Quisp
- S'mores Grahams
- Sprinkle Spangles
- Yummy Mummy

=== Soft drinks ===
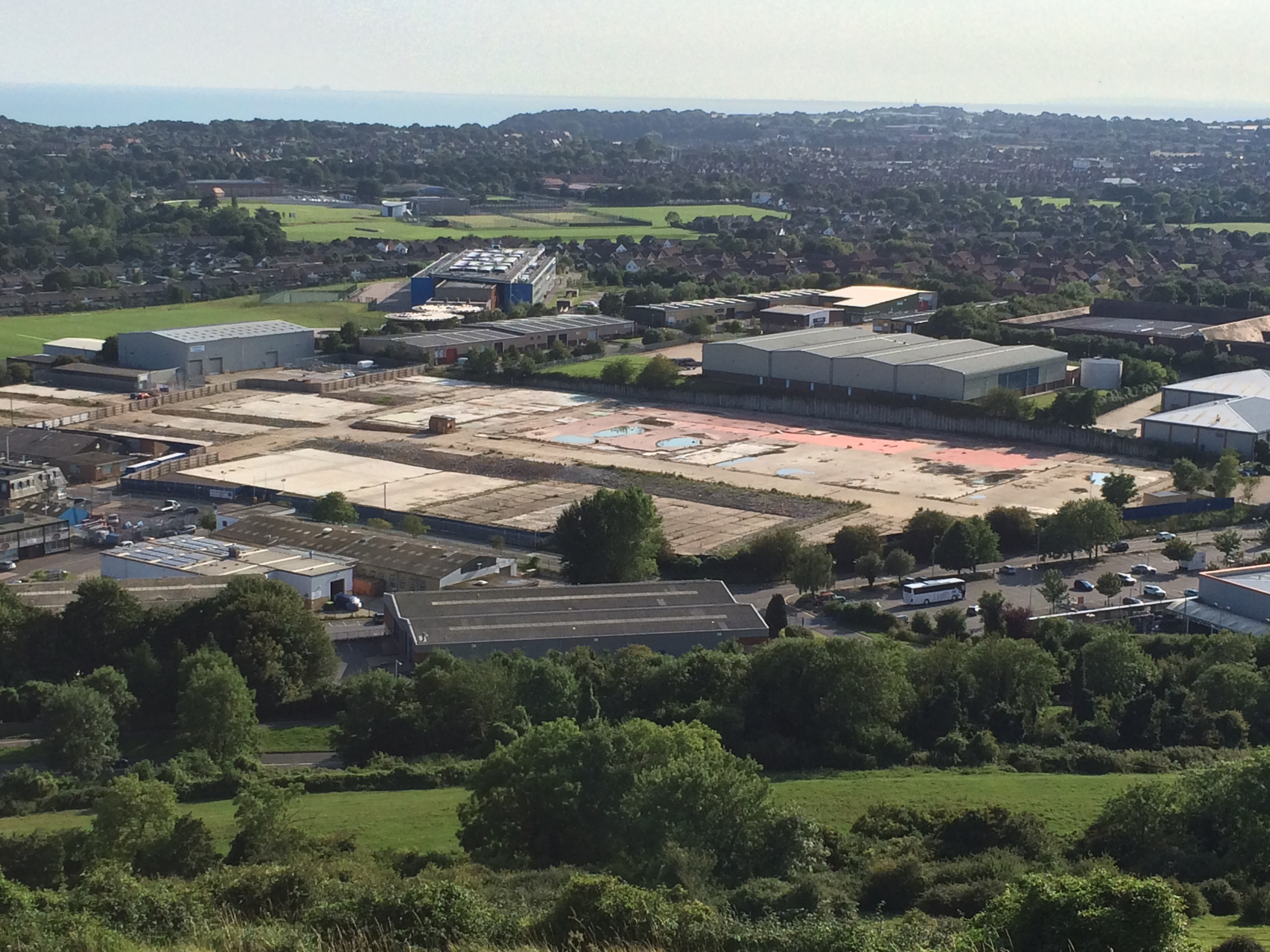
The demolished Silver Spring Soft Drinks plant

- Apotekarnes Cola
- Aspen Soda
- Beep
- Bing
- Burple
- Cavan Cola
- Coca-Cola C2
- Corona
- Crystal Pepsi
- Delaware Punch
- dnL
- Double Seven
- Dr. Nut
- Fanta Citrus
- Fruit Spring
- Hires Root Beer
- Hubba Bubba soda
- Jazz
- Jolt
- Josta
- Kick
- Leed
- Like Cola
- Lurvills Delight
- Northern Neck Ginger Ale
- OK Soda
- Orbitz
- Pepsi Kona
- Pepsi Raw
- Quatro
- Rondo
- Sierra Mist
- Silver Spring Soft Drinks
- Slice
- Squeezit
- Storm
- TaB
- Tab Clear
- Teem
- Vault
- Virgin Cola
- XL Cola

== Heavy manufacturing and processing ==
- Columbus Castings
- Bethlehem Steel
- Fokker
- Hawker Aircraft
- Jeffrey Manufacturing Company
- McDonnell Douglas
- North Brothers Manufacturing Company
- TRW Inc.
- Westinghouse Electric Corporation

== Media ==
- Klasky Csupo
- Filmways
- HIT Entertainment
- TV Ano 30
- The WB
- New World Pictures
- MTM Enterprises
- Screen Gems
- Gramercy Pictures
- Fox Kids

== Retail ==
=== Chain stores ===
- Ames Department Stores
- B. Dalton
- Bed Bath & Beyond
- Big Bear Stores
- Blockbuster LLC
- Bombay Company
- Borders
- Builders Square
- Carter Hawley Hale Stores
- Checker Auto
- Child World
- Circuit City
- CompUSA
- Computer City
- DEKA (New Zealand)
- The Denver Dry Goods Company
- Eaton's
- Eckerd Pharmacy
- Elder-Beerman
- Fishers Big Wheel
- Fred Schmidt
- Fretter
- F. W. Woolworth Company
- Fred's
- Gadzooks
- Gart Sports
- Globe Discount City
- Gold Circle
- Gottschalks
- The Great Indoors
- Hill and Stewart
- Hills Supermarkets
- Hollywood Video
- HomeBase
- H. H. Gregg
- Incredible Universe
- KB Toys
- Kragen Auto
- Lechmere
- The Limited
- Lionel Kiddie City (1980-1993), Lionel Playworld (1969-1993), Lionel Toy Warehouse (1969-1990)
- Manga Store
- Media Play
- Microsoft Store (retail)
- Musicland
- Target Canada
- The May Department Stores Company
- Mervyn's
- Montgomery Ward
- Murray's Discount Auto
- The Nature Company
- OnCue
- Pace Membership Warehouse
- Pamida
- Payless Cashways Building Materials, Furrow Building Materials, Lumberjack Building Materials, Hugh M. Woods Building Materials, Knox Lumber, Somerville Lumber, Contractor Supply
- Pier 1 Imports
- Phar-Mor
- Pic 'N' Save
- Radioshack
- Rite-Aid
- Sam Goody
- Sears Canada
- Shopko
- Shucks Auto Supply
- Silo
- SoundTrack
- Steve & Barry's
- Suncoast Video
- Sports Authority
- TG&Y
- The Original Factory Shop
- Toys "R" Us
- Tweeter
- Ultimate Electronics
- Waldenbooks
- Western Auto
- Woodward & Lothrop
- Zayre
- Zellers

=== Clothing and accessories ===
- Avenue
- Elgin National Watch Company
- I. Magnin
- Jean Lassale
- Structure (clothing brand)

=== Consumer electronics and software ===
- Apple Newton
- Apple QuickTake
- Commodore International
- Compaq
- Gateway 2000
- iPod
- Microsoft Band
- Microsoft Kin
- Microsoft Lumia
- RCA
- Windows Mobile
- Windows Phone
- Zune
- Zune HD

=== Home consumer products ===
- Burma-Shave
- Darlie
- Gleem
- Sani Flush
- Wisk

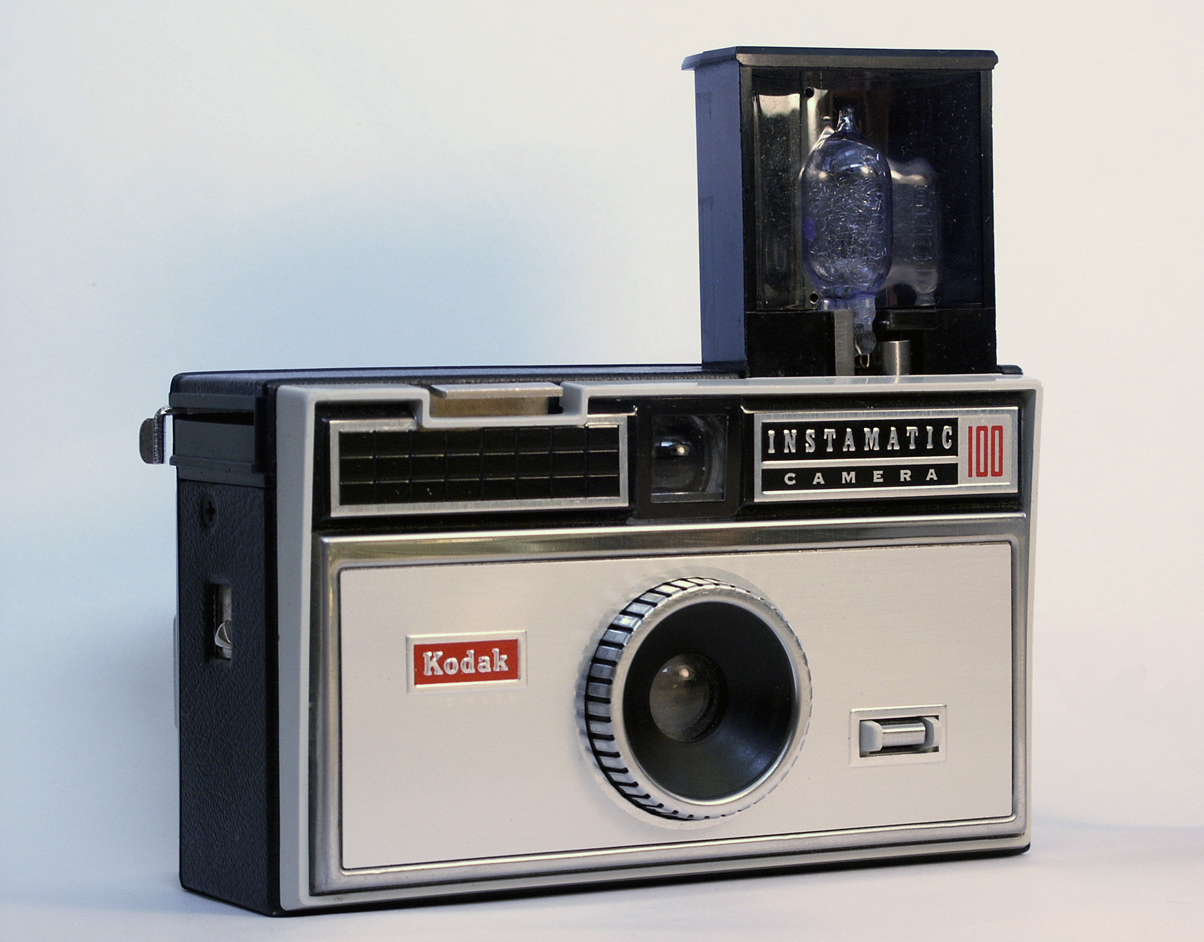
The Instamatic 100, the first Instamatic sold in the United States

=== Photography ===
- Instamatic
- Land Camera
- Minolta

=== Toy manufacturers ===
- Coleco
- Kenner Products
- National Amusement Devices
- Trendmasters

== Shipping ==
- Hanjin Shipping
- Union Company

== Telecommunications ==
- 10-10-321
- Adelphia Communications Corporation
- AT&T Broadband
- Bell System
- Cablevision
- Cingular Wireless
- GTE
- MCI Inc.
- Northwestern Bell
- Ohio Bell
- Pacific Northwest Bell
- Qwest
- South Central Bell
- Southern Bell
- Tele-Communications Inc.
- US West

== See also ==
- Lists of brands
- List of defunct breweries in the United States
- List of defunct department stores of the United States
- McDonald's Deluxe line
- New Coke
