= Cröonchy Stars =

Breakfast cereal made by Post

Cröonchy Stars cereal box

Crø̈ønchy Stars was a breakfast cereal by Post Cereal of North America. The cereal was released in 1988, and discontinued about a year later, though it made a brief return in 1992. The box featured the Swedish Chef from The Muppet Show, who described the cereal as "cinnamonnamony". The product's name is likely a pseudo-phonetic rendition of how the Chef would pronounce "crunchy." The back of the box featured ridiculous, and sometimes unsolvable, games and puzzles, including a memory-type card game on every box.

Most of the cereal's labeling and promotional material used the idiosyncratic spelling Swed̈ish Chef, with an umlaut over the letter "d". This is an instance of an umlaut being unconventionally used over a consonant, as with Spın̈al Tap.

Nora Singh, a recording studio assistant working with Dr. Teeth and the Electric Mayhem, is shown eating a bowl of Cröonchy Stars cereal in episode six of the 2023 Disney+ series The Muppets Mayhem, with an original box for the cereal present on the table.

== See also ==
- List of defunct consumer brands
