= Fruit Spring =

British beverage brand

Robinson's Fruit Spring was a combination of fruit juices and spring water, produced by Britvic drinks and sold in the United Kingdom. It was discontinued in February 2009, to be replaced by the "Juicy Drench" brand (440ml).

== Flavours ==
Robinsons Fruit Spring was available in three flavours; Blackcurrant & Raspberry, Orange & Mandarin and Apple & Cranberry. Each flavour came in 440ml single bottles.

== See also ==
- List of defunct consumer brands
