= H. & J. Pfaff Brewing Company =

Brewing Company

- Industry: Alcoholic beverage
- Founded: 1857
- Founder: Henry Pfaff; Jacob Pfaff
- Headquarters: Boston, Massachusetts, USA
- Products: Lager, Beer

The H. & J. Pfaff Brewing Company was a brewery founded by brothers Henry and Jacob Pfaff in 1857, in Boston, Massachusetts, USA.

== Pfaff Family ==
Henry and Jacob Pfaff were children of German immigrants, Carl and Katherine Pfaff. The family moved from Hochspeyer, Bavaria to the United States in 1834.

Jacob Pfaff married Hannah Adams in 1854 and had two children, Charles and Adrienne.

On February 20, 1900, Jacob Pfaff died at 71 years old.

== Brewery ==
Henry and Jacob Pfaff began the brewery in 1857. The company started with eight men and in the first year they brewed 6,000 barrels of lager. Compared to German lager, Pfaff's beer was a lighter lager with a shorter fermentation time. In the Boston Daily Globe, the H. & J. Brewery Company was said to be "among the first to introduce light beer to New England People."

Before the company had electric refrigeration, they connected cold air shafts from the beer storage vats to the ice storage space. By 1907 the plant did everything "from the grinding of the malt to the filling of the packages with the finished beer."

In 1888, H. & J. Pfaff Brewing Company was valued at $200,000.

In 1900, H. & J. Brewery Co. merged with nine other Boston-area breweries to create the Mass Breweries Company with Charles Pfaff as the president.

== Controversy ==
In the spring of 1890, Brewer's Union No.4 started a boycott against eight brewerines in the Boston area, including the "scab" beer made by H. & J. Pfaff Brewery Company. The union was demanding eight hour work days, raises, and safer working conditions.

== Advertisements ==
H. & J. Pfaff Brewery Company advertised in the Boston Globe. The slogans used included "Best Brewed Because Brewed Best" and "Pfaff's Beer Pfor the Pfastidious."

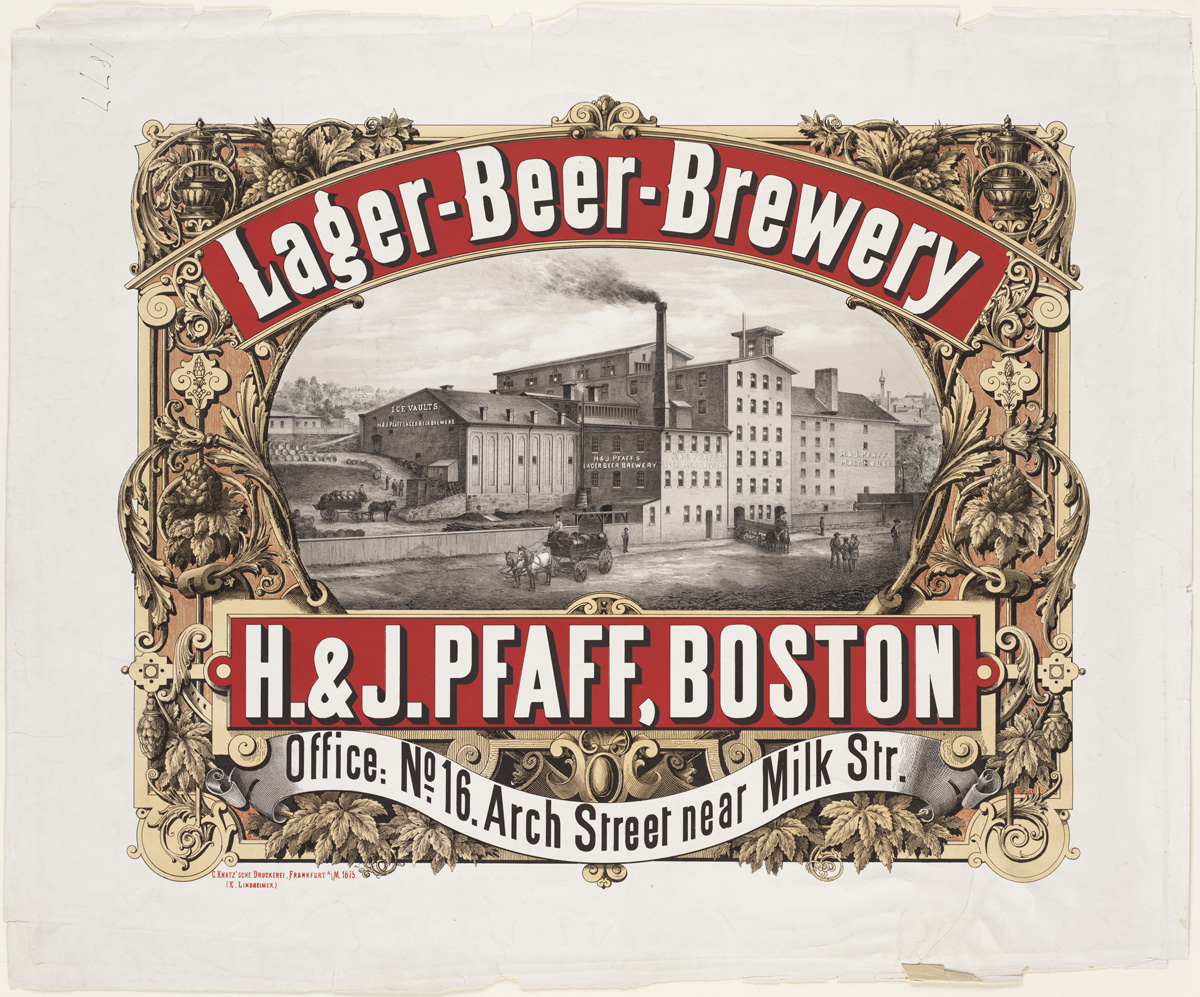
The H. & J. Pfaff brewery pictured on an advertisement from 1877

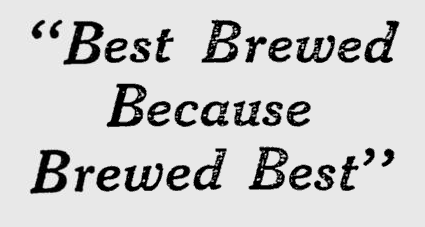
H. & J. Pfaff company slogan

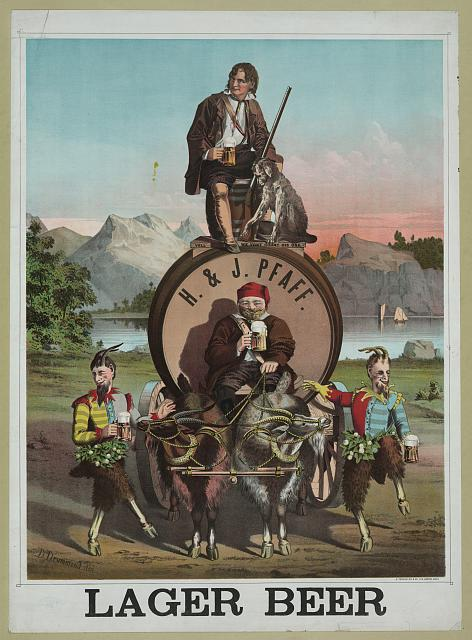
H. & J. Pfaff Lager Beer advertisement

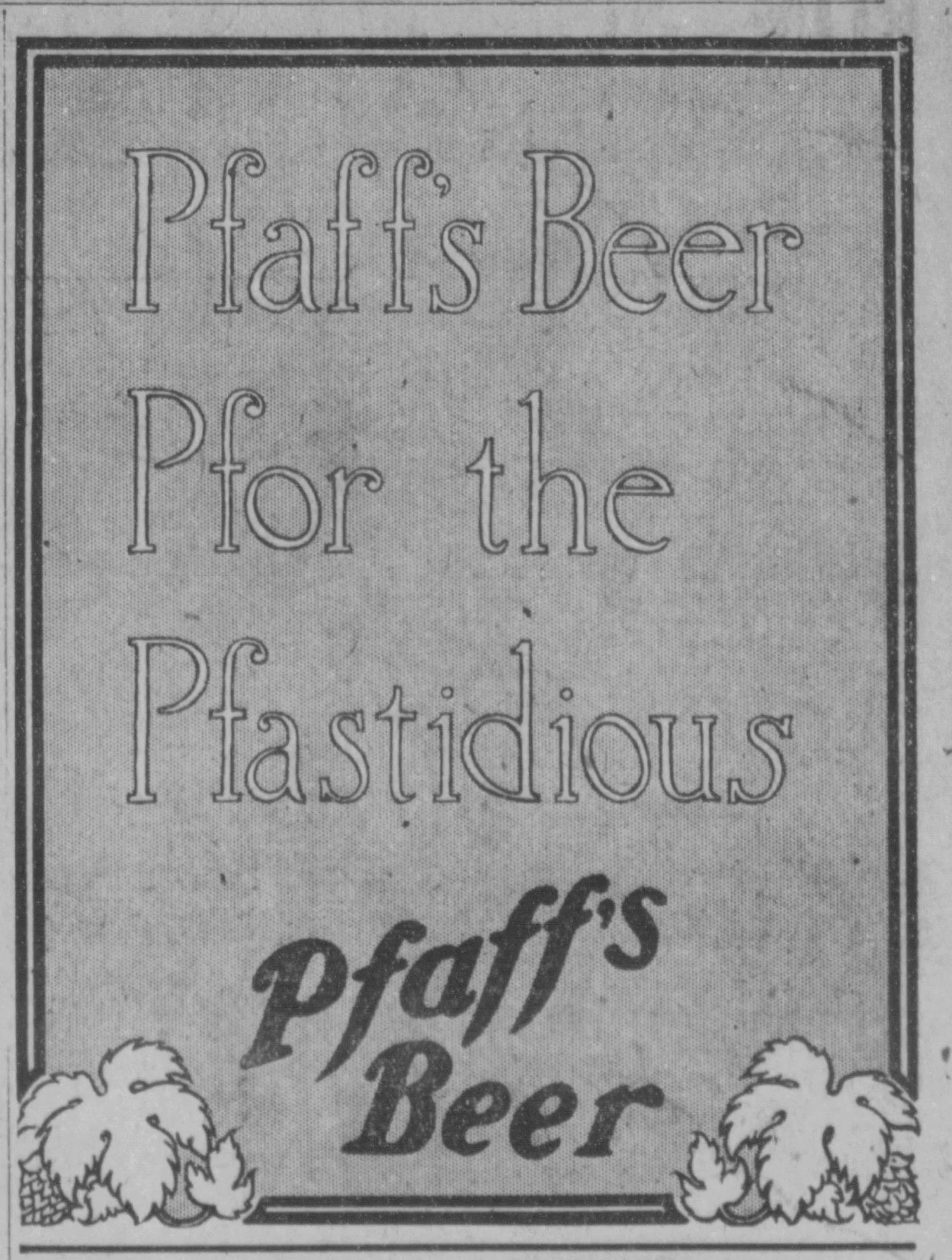
A 1915 newspaper advertisement for Pfaff's Beer from H. & J. Pfaff's Brewing Company

== See also ==
- List of defunct consumer brands
