= Lurvills Delight =

Welsh soft drink brand

Lurvills Delight was a popular carbonated soft drink in Wales between 1896 and 1910. It was invented in 1896 by Harold and Iolo Lewis in 1896.

Lurvill's Delight was brought back in September 2016 by Lurvills Delight Ltd with The Original Botanical Blend bottled soft drink going back into production in Wales. London liquor retailer Borough Wines & Beers began carrying Lurvills Delight as part of its non-alcoholic line in 2017.

== See also ==
- List of defunct consumer brands
