= Beep (soft drink) =

Canadian beverage brand

- Type: Juice
- Manufacturer: Farmers Cooperative Dairy, now owned by Agropur.
- Origin: Canada
- Introduced: 1960's
- Discontinued: 2015
- Color: Orange

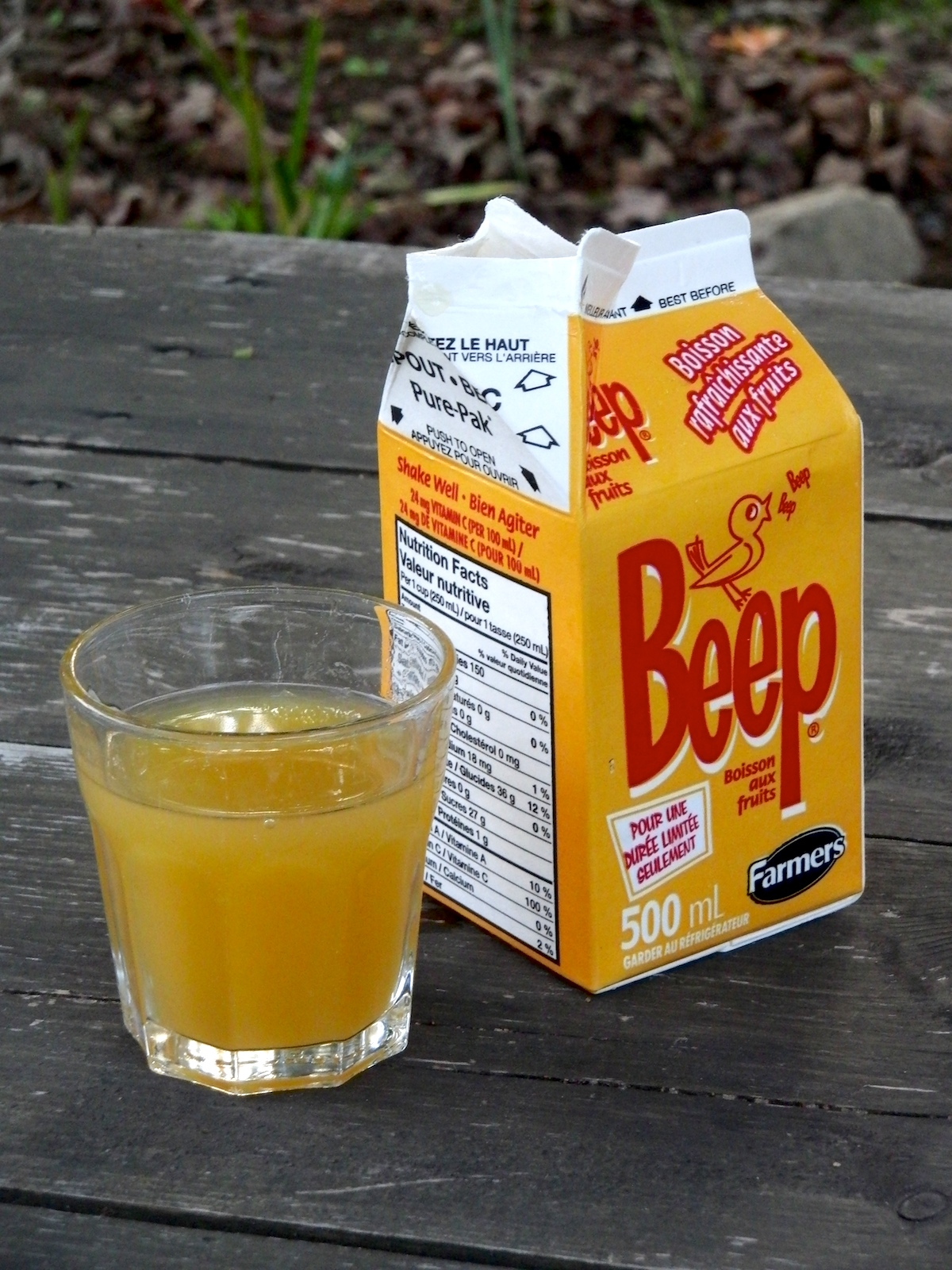
The 'revived' Beep carton, 2012.

Beep was a fruit-juice-based drink brand, made by Farmers Cooperative Dairy of Nova Scotia, Canada, and distributed in Canadian provinces.

Originally produced in the 1960s, it was discontinued in March 2010; was temporarily revived in 2012 as a seasonal summertime drink; and was discontinued a second time in 2015. Its revival in 2012 featured a vintage carton different from the carton used at the time it was discontinued.

According to the carton, the drink contained water, sugar, fruit juices (orange, apple, apricot, prune, and pineapple), citric acid, orange pulp, natural flavours, sodium citrate, canola oil, modified corn starch, sodium benzoate, caramel colour, annatto, and ascorbic acid.

== See also ==
- List of defunct consumer brands
