= Bunker Hill Breweries =

Former brewery in Boston, Massachusetts

Coordinates: 42°23′10″N 71°04′25″W

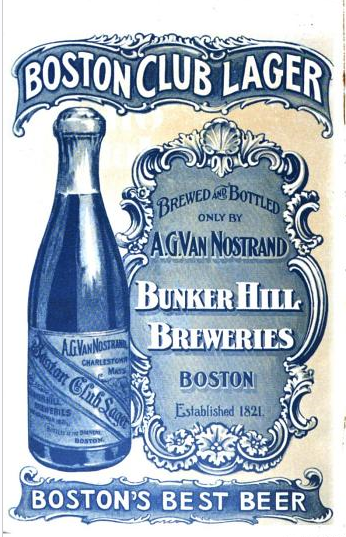
- Industry: Alcoholic beverage
- Founded: 1821
- Founder: John Cooper and Thomas Gould
- Defunct: 1918
- Headquarters: 40 Alford Street, Charlestown, Boston, Massachusetts, USA
- Products: Beer, Ale
- Owner: A. G. Van Nostrand; William Van Nostrand

Bunker Hill Breweries was a brewery founded in 1821 by John Cooper and Thomas Gould in Charlestown (now part of Boston), Massachusetts, USA. The original purchare of the property on Alfred St, was made by Cooper and Gould from Samuel Swan in June, 1821, the price paid being $500. A brewery was established, and in 1824 Mr. Robbins was taken into purtnership, and for two years the enterprise was conducted by the three men named. Then the establishment was purchased by Judge Phinney of Lexington, it was then known as the Canal brewery after the Middlesex canal of those days. In May, 1841, Mr Phinney sold out to John Kent, an English brewer, who was then living in Boston, and Mr Kent ran the brewery until 1871, when it was purchased by W. T. Van Nostrand.

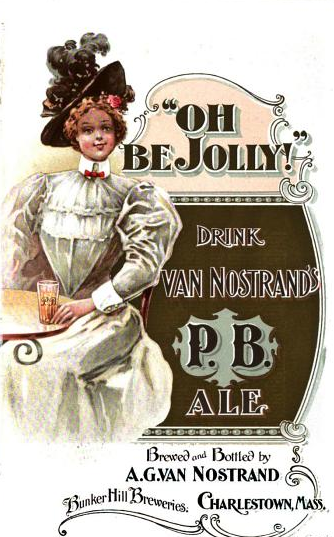
Bunker Hill Breweries' advertisement for its PB (Purest and Best) Ale

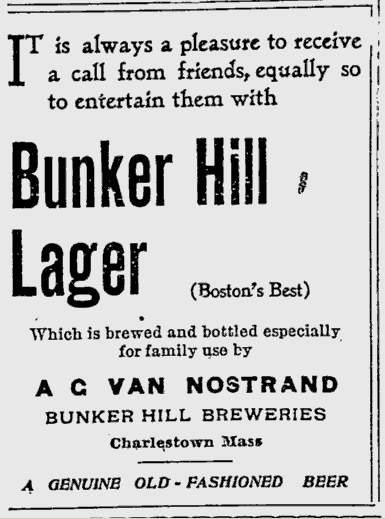
Bunker Hill Breweries' ad for Lager from The Boston Evening Transcript of October 24, 1896

== See also ==
- List of defunct consumer brands
- List of defunct breweries in the United States
