= XL Cola =

Swedish soft drink

- Type: soft drink
- Manufacturer: Falcon Brewery
- Origin: Sweden
- Introduced: 1985; 41 years ago
- Discontinued: 2000s
- Colour: brown
- Flavour: cola
- Variants: XL Cola Light
- Related products: Apotekarnes Cola; Cuba Cola; Kitty Kola

XL Cola was a cola-flavoured soft drink produced in Sweden.

XL Cola was launched by Falcon Brewery in 1985, including the slogan "Extra Large Taste". It was introduced as a competitor for the Swedish customers of Coca-Cola customers who did not like New Coke.

In 1996, Falcon Brewery was taken over by Carlsberg Group. In 2006, the trademark for XL Cola was also taken over by Carlsberg Sweden. The trademark also contains an image mark, the letters XL over narrow stripes and the word Cola in smaller letters. As of 2015, the brand is not manufactured; this is probably because Carlsberg owns the Swedish license for Pepsi.

== See also ==
- List of defunct consumer brands
