= Squeezit =

Fruit beverage

Squeezit was a fruit-flavored juice made by General Mills created in 1985 before being discontinued in 2001. Squeezit also appeared in stores from mid-2006 to mid-2007 and in 2011 and 2012. The drink came in a plastic bottle that the drinker had to squeeze in order to extract the beverage from its container, hence the name.

Squeezit came in multiple flavors and editions, one of which contained "color pellets" that the drinker dropped into the bottle to change the color of the Squeezit. The flavors included Chucklin' Cherry, Berry B. Wild, Grumpy Grape (later changed to Gallopin' Grape), Silly Billy Strawberry, Rockin' Red Puncher, Mean Green Puncher, Smarty Arty Orange, and Troppi Tropical Punch. Each flavor had a different character designed into the plastic bottle. For a limited time there were "mystery" flavors in black bottles, where the drinker had to guess the flavor. There were also Life Savers Squeezit, featuring flavors such as Wild Watermelon, Blue Raspberry, and Tropical Fruit.

== Twist N Squeeze ==
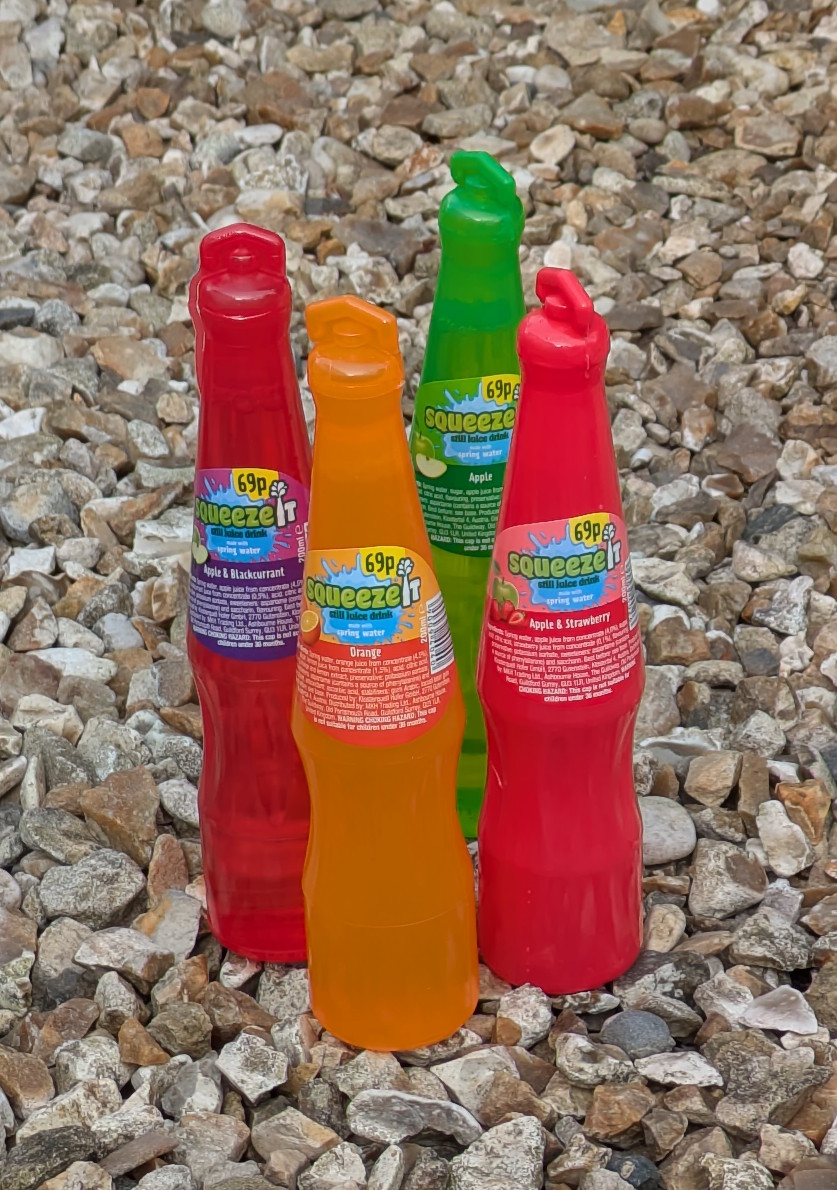
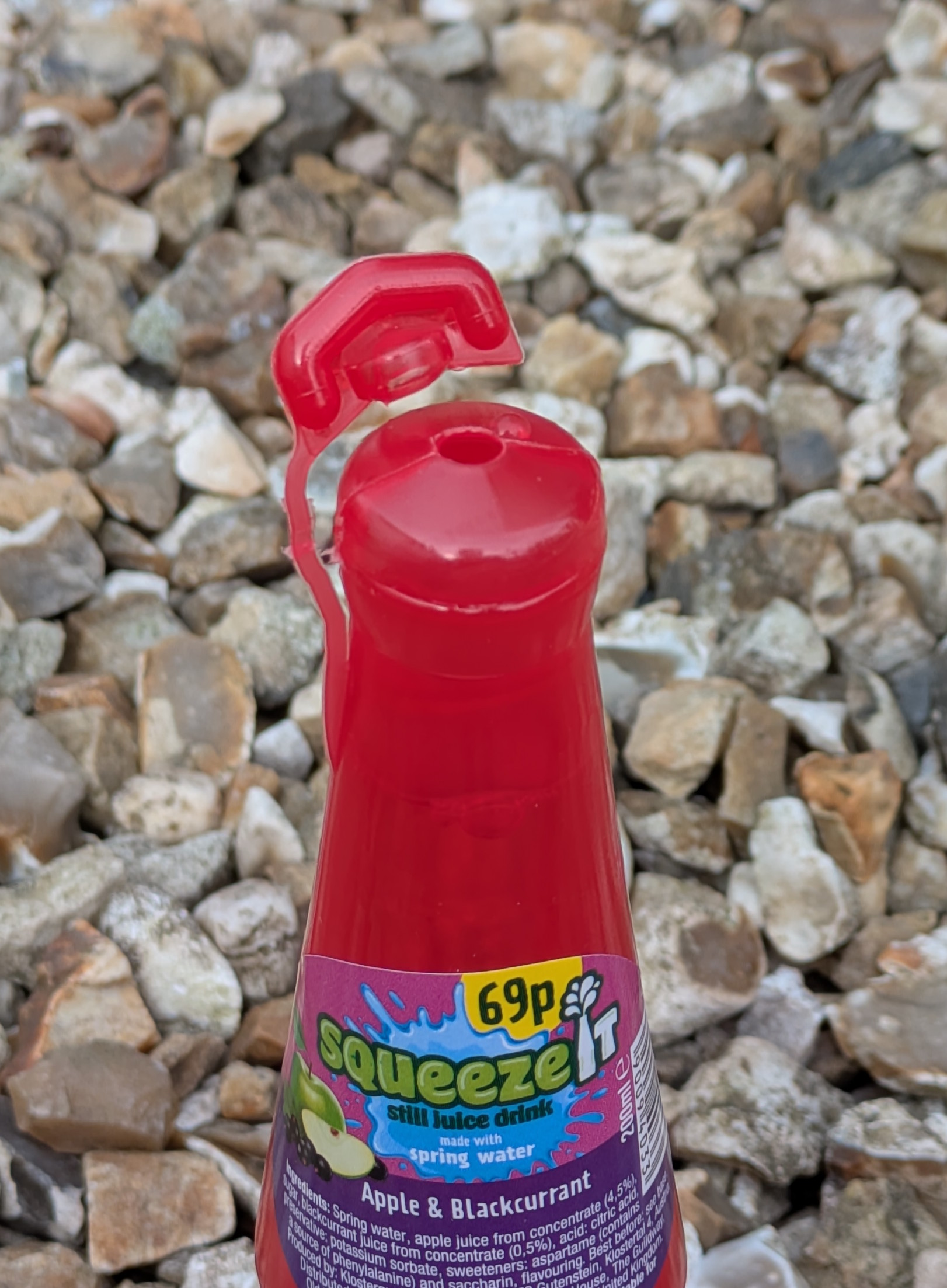
A selection of Squeeze It bottles available in the UK with the distinctive wingnut-shaped tops. To open them, the tops are twisted which tears them from the main body of the bottle and creates a hole for the liquid to flow through. A thin bar of plastic keeps the top attached to the body of the bottle even after opening to comply with EU Directive 2019/904 making the top a form of tethered cap.

In the UK, a similar drink existed known as "Twist N Squeeze", sold in similar bottle designs and similar flavours. These drinks are still available, although they are now sold under the name "Squeeze It" which are produced by Austrian company Klosterquell Hofer GmbH who also sell them as Dreh und Trink ("Twist and Drink").

== See also ==
- List of defunct consumer brands
