= The Swerve (film) =

- Directed by: Dean Kapsalis
- Written by: Dean Kapsalis
- Produced by: Tommy Minnix
- Starring: Azura Skye; Bryce Pinkham; Ashley Bell
- Cinematography: Daryl Pittman
- Edited by: Alec Styborski; Dean Kapsalis
- Music by: Mark Korven
- Production company: Spark Chamber
- Distributed by: Epic Pictures
- Release date: November 5, 2018 (Thessaloniki International Film Festival)
- Running time: 95 minutes
- Country: United States
- Language: English

The Swerve is a 2018 American horror drama film written and directed by Dean Kapsalis. It delves into the complexities of mental illness through the life of Holly, played by Azura Skye. As a high school teacher in a quiet town, Holly grapples with personal challenges, including a strained marriage and haunting memories.

The film was released at the Thessaloniki International Film Festival on November 5, 2018. It was released at subsequent film festivals and became available via streaming.

== Plot ==
The Swerve follows Holly (Azura Skye), a high school teacher in a small town. Holly is married to Rob (Bryce Pinkham), who is focused on a promotion at the local supermarket, and is the mother to two teenage sons who frequently show impatience and irritation towards her. Despite her seemingly ordinary life, Holly is grappling with emotional and mental challenges.

Throughout her daily routine, Holly encounters a series of stressors. Her children often fault her for minor problems, and one of her high school students, Paul (Zach Rand), displays a concerning fascination with her, which is underscored when she finds troubling sketches of herself in his notebook. Holly's relationship with her estranged sister, Claudia (Ashley Bell), is fraught due to their shared difficult past. This tension surfaces during a family meal, where Claudia brings up a painful aspect of Holly's history, causing discomfort for Holly.

A mouse that frequently appears in Holly's house becomes an object of her fixation. Concurrently, visible signs of sleep deprivation and her regular visits to the medicine cabinet hint at her ongoing internal battles.

Holly starts to doubt her husband's loyalty and increasingly feels detached from her surroundings. This feeling intensifies when Holly has a distressing encounter with strangers on a remote road following a family event. This incident further muddies Holly's sense of reality, leading her to question her own experiences.

As events unfold, Holly's behavior becomes more erratic. The film depicts Holly's struggle, not as a result of a singular event but as an accumulation of various pressures.

== Critical reception ==
Lorry Kikta of Film Threat wrote that the film depicts Holly's mental health deterioration through a series of "upsetting events", describing the experience as "devastating" and calling it "one of the most depressing horror films" they had seen, while also describing it as "amazingly cathartic". Sheila O'Malley of RogerEbert.com wrote that the film shows the "total breakdown of a human being", describing Holly's collapse as an "accelerated dissolution" in which there is "no turning back", and stating that the breakdown is not presented as being caused by any single external circumstance. Martyn Conterio of CineVue described the film as a "psychological drama" about a suburbanite losing her grip on reality, identifying a rodent bite and a recurring nightmare about a car crash that "may or may not have happened in waking life" as catalysts for her descent, and describing the setting as domestic normality concealing a "Lynchian nightmare". Richard Whittaker of the Austin Chronicle wrote that Holly's situation is defined by the accumulation of multiple stressors, presenting her strain as the result of many simultaneous pressures rather than one isolated cause.

Several reviewers focused on Azura Skye's performance. O'Malley of RogerEbert.com wrote that the film would not register "without Azura Skye’s tremendous performance", describing it as "uncompromising" and detailing how Skye tracks Holly's deterioration through specific physical and behavioral details. Whittaker of the Austin Chronicle wrote that Skye's performance presents Holly as barely holding herself together, describing it as "captivating" and noting how her expressions change when she believes she is unobserved. Roger Moore of Movie Nation described Skye's work as a "broken, powerhouse performance", and wrote that director Dean Kapsalis keeps the camera close to her face to capture "every body blow" and humiliation the character experiences. Conterio of CineVue wrote that the lead role is "well played", describing Skye's gaunt appearance and haunted expressions as reinforcing the sense that Holly is becoming psychologically and physically brittle.

Reviewers also commented on direction and formal elements. O'Malley of RogerEbert.com wrote that director Kapsalis tells the story in a "controlled" manner, pointing to a blue-and-grey color scheme, off-center framing, and Mark Korven’s "unnerving score", which she wrote gives Holly’s mental state the feel of a horror film. Whittaker of the Austin Chronicle wrote that Kapsalis builds tension quietly through sustained setup, describing the film as offering "no moment of rest", and noted that costume designer Eric Hall and cinematographer Daryl Pitman increasingly drain color from Holly while keeping her centered in the frame. Conterio of CineVue wrote that Kapsalis opts for "subtlety over big-scene meltdown histrionics", describing the result as a depiction of existential angst, melancholy, and mental illness. Kikta of Film Threat wrote that Kapsalis conveys Holly's suffering without "belittling or objectifying" the character and singled out the ending as "one of the best" they had encountered. O'Malley of RogerEbert.com wrote that the film is "the opposite of comforting", and stated of the title's meaning, "You'll have to see it to find out."
