= Sockerdricka =

Swedish soft drink brand

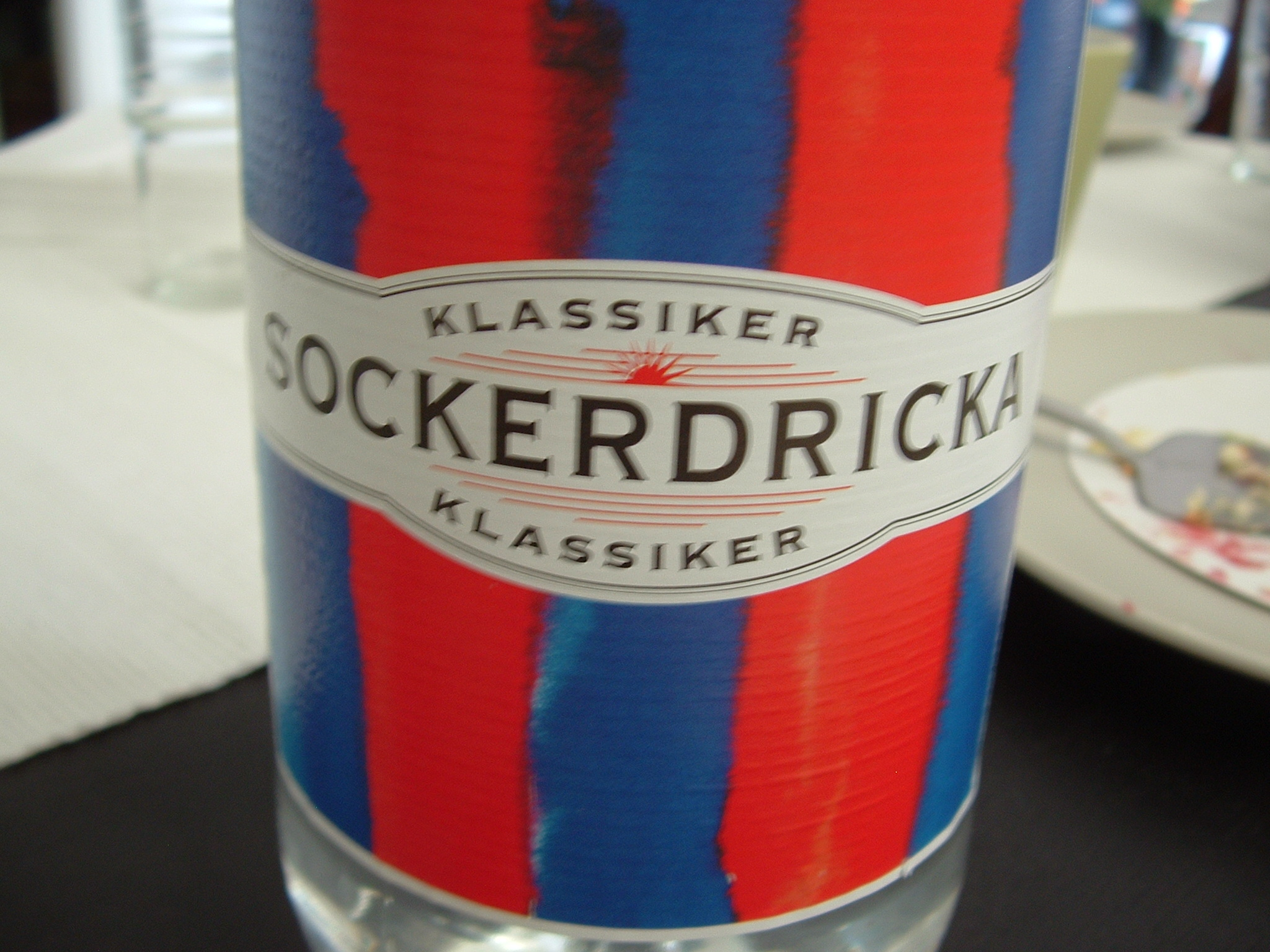
Sockerdricka

Sockerdricka (Swedish for 'sugar drink') is a soft drink dating from the 19th century. Originally it was brewed and also contained ginger, but nowadays it consists of carbonated water, sugar, citric acid, and flavorants. It is quite similar to Fruktsoda. It is still sold, despite strong competition from more modern soft drinks such as 7 Up and Sprite. Sockerdricka is a popular base for many cocktails.
