= Swerve (drink) =

Dairy drink

The original three drink line-up of Swerve dairy drinks from the early 2000s.

Swerve was a flavored and vitamin-fortified dairy drink introduced in the United States in 2003 by The Coca-Cola Company. It contained 51% skim milk, was sweetened by a blend of sugar and sucralose, and provided 30% of the recommended daily allowance of Vitamins A and C and calcium. It was available in three flavors: a vanilla-banana flavor called Vanana, a blueberry-strawberry flavor called Blooo, and a chocolate flavor. It was most often found in school cafeterias.

The drink's label carried the American Heart Association's "Heart Smart" seal, for meeting the "food criteria for saturated fat and cholesterol for healthy people over age 2". It also carried the dairy industry's "Real Seal" because it was 51% real dairy product by weight (51% being the minimum requirement for obtaining the seal).

However, water and sweeteners made up much of the other 49% of the drink, and the calorie count for an 12-ounce can of Swerve Chocolate Drink was 160 calories – more than the approximately 150 calories found in an equivalent can of Coca-Cola Classic.

The drink was not very popular with children and became increasingly harder to find. When Coca-Cola discontinued Swerve in 2005; only the chocolate flavor remained on the market.

== See also ==
- List of defunct consumer brands
