= Swervin (disambiguation) =

"Swervin" is a 2019 song by A Boogie wit da Hoodie. It may also refer to:

- "Swervin" (BlocBoy JB song), 2020 song by BlocBoy JB from FatBoy
- "Swervin'", 2019 song by PnB Rock from TrapStar Turnt PopStar
