= Cinnamon Toast Crunch =

General Mills breakfast cereal

Cinnamon Toast Crunch™
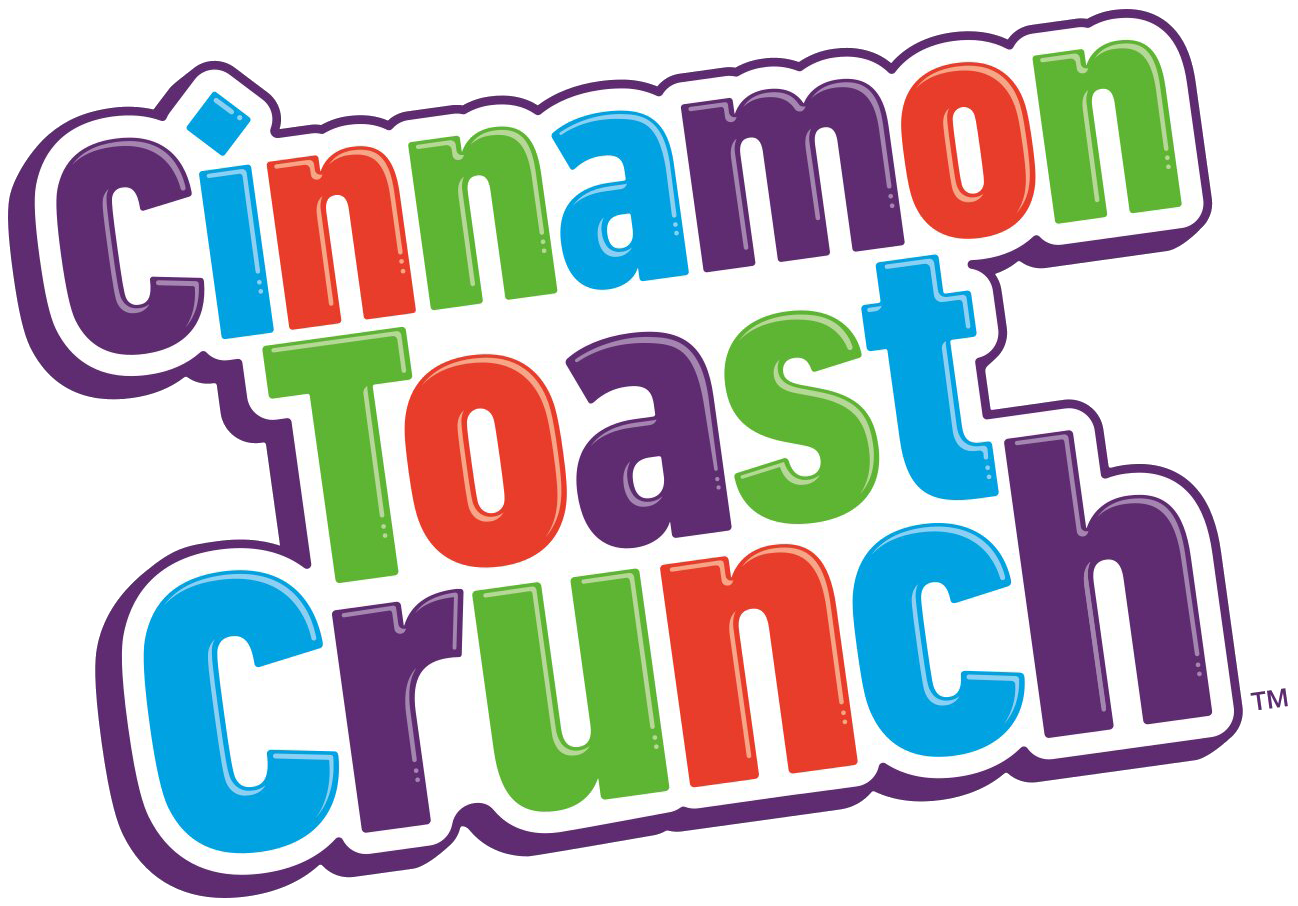

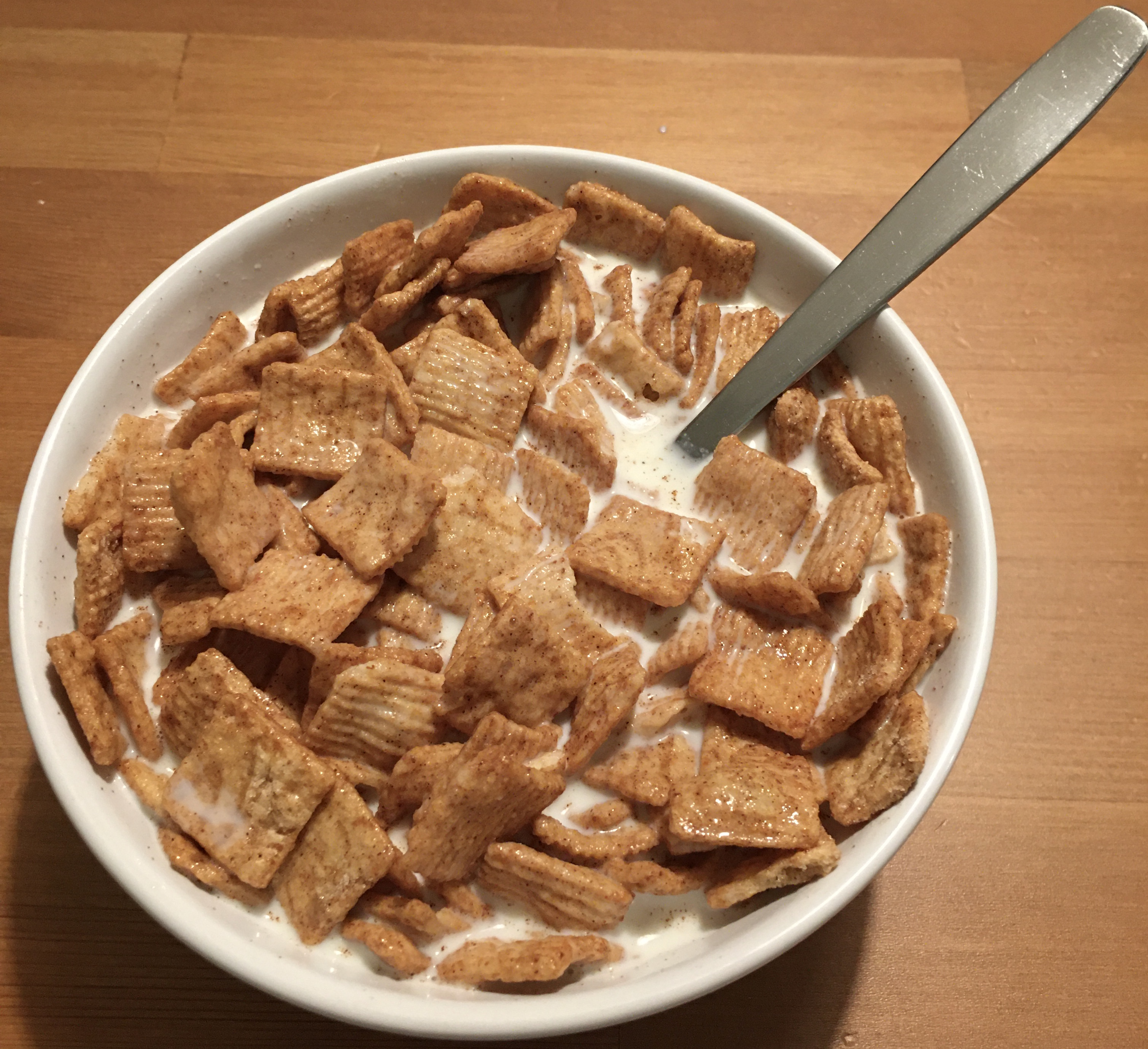
- Cinnamon Toast Crunch breakfast cereal. "Crispy, Sweetened Whole Wheat & Rice Cereal"
- Product type: Breakfast cereal
- Current owner: General Mills
- Produced by: General Mills (US); Nestlé (outside US)
- Country: United States
- Introduced: March 5, 1984; 42 years ago
- Tagline: "Crave Those Crazy Squares", "The Taste You Can See", "Unlock the Cinnaverse", "Blasted With Cinna-Dust", "Crazily Cinnamon", "Must Cinnadust" (Note: Cini Minis)
- Website: cinnamontoastcrunch.com

Cinnamon Toast Crunch known as Croque-Cannelle in French Canada, Curiously Cinnamon in the UK (previously Cinnamon Grahams), and as Cini Minis in other European and Latin American countries, is a breakfast cereal produced by General Mills in the United States & Canada and Cereal Partners under the Nestlé brand in other countries. First produced in 1984, the cereal aims to provide the taste of cinnamon toast in a crunchy cereal format. The cereal consists of small squares or rectangles of wheat and rice covered with cinnamon and sugar. The cereal is puffed and when immersed in milk, it makes a "snap" noise, similar to Rice Krispies. In most European countries and North America, the product is sold in boxes, but in Poland, Slovakia and Russia the cereal is sold in bags. The product was originally marketed outside Europe with the mascot of a jolly baker named Wendell. Wendell was replaced as a mascot by the "Crazy Squares", sentient Cinnamon Toast Crunch squares that often eat each other in commercials. The Crazy Squares were replaced by the similar-looking 2D "Cinnamojis" in the US in 2020, the Crazy Squares are still used in the United Kingdom. In September 2025, the 2014 box returned for a 2010s throwback, including the 2003 General Mills logo.

== History ==
=== United States ===
Originally, the crunch was plain squares but currently features cinnamon-colored swirling on each piece. It was invented by scientist John Mendesh and General Mills assistant product manager Elisabeth Trach after receiving the idea from an unnamed child in a "give us your best idea for a Crunch" radio contest held by General Mills. The child received a set of Hot Wheels toys as a grand prize. Starting in 1985 there were three animated bakers as the mascots, one of which is named Wendell. The other two bakers, known as Bob and Quello, were considerably more youthful in appearance than Wendell. In 1991, the younger bakers were dropped, leaving Wendell as the sole mascot for several years until 2013.

=== United Kingdom ===
The product was first introduced to the United Kingdom and Ireland in 1998 by Cereal Partners, as Cinnamon Toast Crunch, the same name as the popular North American cereal brand. The name was later changed to Cinnamon Grahams, similar to Golden Grahams, another Nestlé product. The name was once again changed to its current name of Curiously Cinnamon, produced by Cereal Partners under the Nestlé brand.

== Description ==
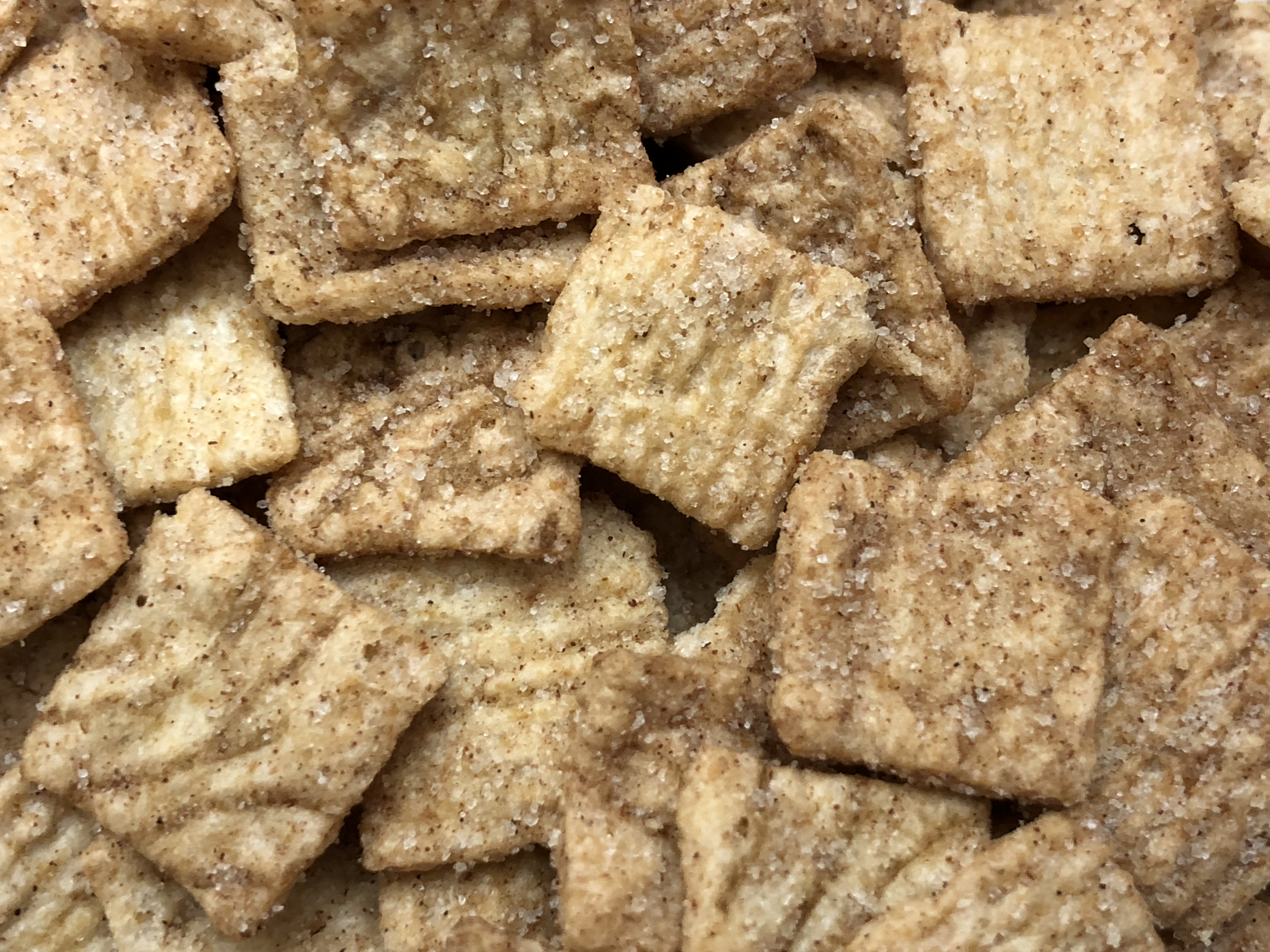
Close-up of Cinnamon Toast Crunch

Cinnamon Toast Crunch consists of whole grain wheat and rice squares, then coated in a mixture of cinnamon and sugar, and fortified with various vitamins and minerals.

One serving of Cinnamon Toast Crunch cereal, equal to 3/4 cup (~180 mL) (177 mL) or 31 g, has 130 calories (544 kJ), or 170 calories (711 kJ) with 1/2 cup (~120 mL) (118 mL) of skim milk. A single serving has 3 g of total fat, no cholesterol, 220 mg of sodium, and 45 mg of potassium. One serving has 25 g of total carbohydrates with 2 g of dietary fiber and 9 g of sugars with 14 g of other carbohydrates. A single serving also contains 1 g of protein. Cinnamon Toast Crunch was reformulated in an industry-led sugar reduction effort in 2012. The original formulation contained 10 grams per 3/4 cup (~180 mL) serving, while the 2012 reformulation (still current as of 2021) contains 9 grams sugar per 3/4 cup (~180 mL) serving.

== Marketing ==
Originally, the three bakers were the mascots and the cereal did not have a slogan. Starting in 1995, it was given the slogan, "The taste you can see." In 2007, Cinnamon Toast Crunch experimented with a new slogan, "It's That Intense", but switched back after poor reception. In 2009, the slogan became "Crave those crazy squares". In 2019, the slogan changed to either "Unlock the Cinnaverse" or "Blasted With Cinna-Dust".

In 1997, appealing to adult-oriented programming, a campaign featured the slogan "The adult thing to do", mostly centering on "adult" things reverting to children's, including cereal (for instance, a fictional "adult" cereal named "Health Pellets" is replaced with Cinnamon Toast Crunch). This was changed in 2004 to "Breakfast on a whole other level", which was replaced with "Crave those crazy squares" in 2009.

Then again in 2019, Cinnamon Toast Crunch under General Mills underwent a brand redesign and sought to strengthen their position in an increasingly competitive breakfast market. General Mills collaborated with an agency Pearlfisher to develop a new identity known as “Cinnaverse,” which targeted preteen consumers and extended from packaging, digital advertising, real experiences, and social media. The redesign was visually focused, introducing colorful characters known as “Cinnamojis” encouraging customers to interact with their brand.

Following this launch in June of 2019, Cinnamon Toast Crunch achieved its largest marketing share in six years and became the fastest growing brand in 2020. Between June of 2019 and June of 2020, there was a 12% growth in the ready to eat cereal category, which was a shift from the previous 0.9 decline in dollar sales volume. This campaign continued to gain market share increasing 0.32 percentage point increase in 2021. This market share is between all cinnamon toast products, not just the cereal.

== Spin-offs ==
There have been at least five offshoots of the cereal:

- Chocolate Toast Crunch
- French Toast Crunch in 1995 and again in 2015
- Peanut Butter Toast Crunch in 2004 and 2013
- Frosted Toast Crunch in 2012
- Sugar Cookie Toast Crunch for the 2014 holiday season, 2015, 2018, 2023
- Dulce de Leche Toast Crunch, 2021
- Apple Pie Toast Crunch, 2021
- Lucky Charms Cinnamon Toast Crunch Mix, 2022
- Tres Leches Toast Crunch (2023)

French Toast Crunch is shaped like many little French toast slices, reminiscent of the style of Cookie Crisp. It was discontinued in 2006, but made a return in 2015 due to its cult popularity among its fans. Peanut Butter Toast Crunch was a cereal consisting of flakes similar but darker to Cinnamon Toast Crunch. Frosted Toast Crunch resembles Cinnamon Toast Crunch with vanilla coating. This cereal was discontinued by 2006. As another offshoot, Monopoly Cereal was a limited edition product created in April 2003 by General Mills. The cereal was like Cinnamon Toast Crunch but with the addition of marshmallows based on the pieces in the Monopoly game, such as houses and hotels. Sugar Cookie Toast Crunch was like Cinnamon Toast Crunch except with a sugar cookie taste.

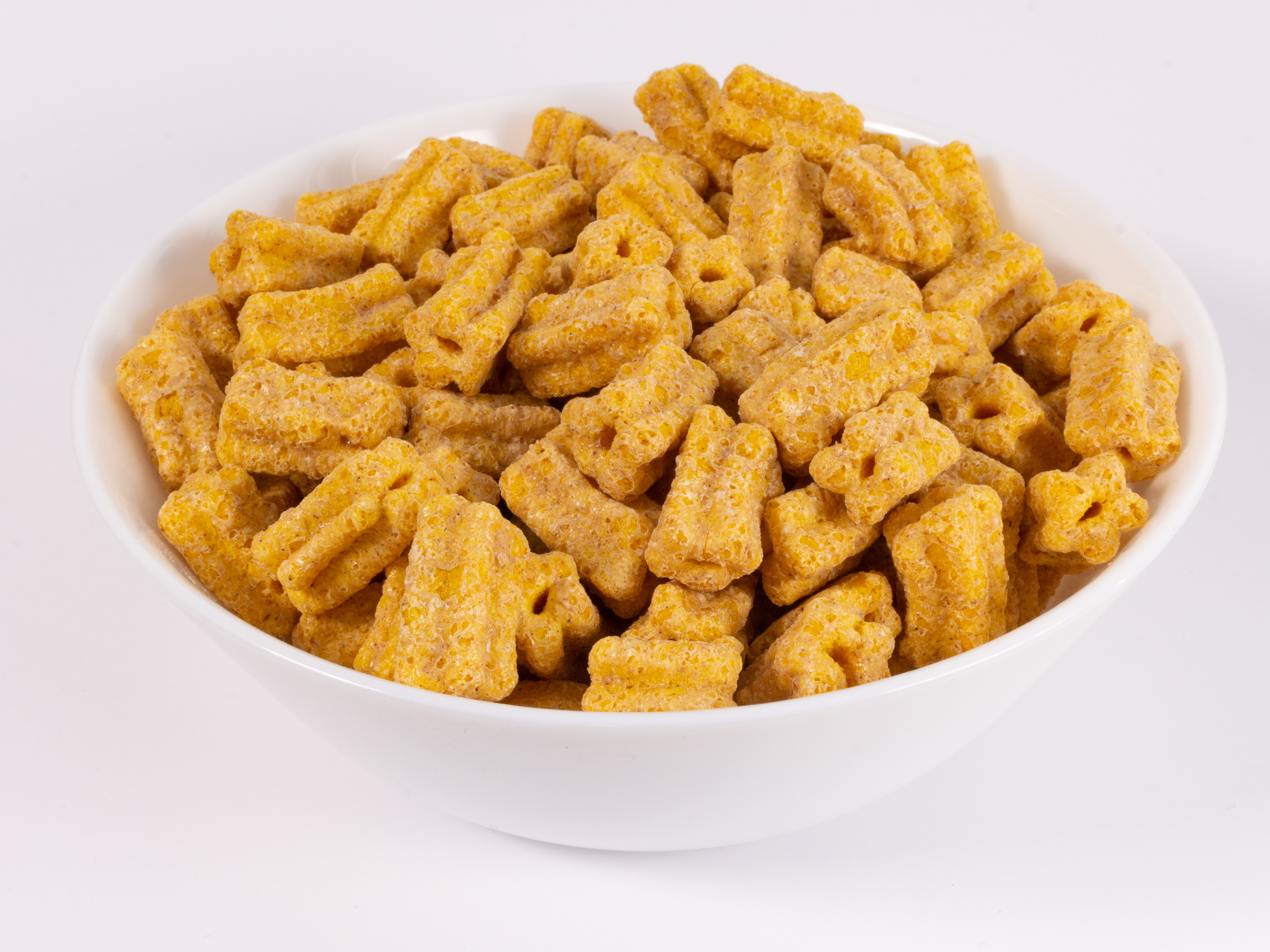
A bowl of Cini Minis Churros

In Germany, Estonia, Austria, Romania, Hungary, Israel, Russia, France and Poland where the cereal is known as Cini Minis, a strawberry flavoured variant named Erdbeer Minis/Strawberry Minis exists. In Germany and Austria it replaced a previously existing apple flavoured variant called Äpple Minis. This strawberry flavoured variant was later released in the UK as Curiously Strawberry.

In 2018, Cinnamon Toast Crunch Churros were introduced. The cereal has the same cinnamon sugar flavor as the original but is shaped like a mini churro. A chocolate version soon followed, and was introduced in 2021 to the UK as Curiously Cinnamon Churros.

In July 2022, General Mills announced CinnaFuego Toast Crunch, a spicy variation of Cinnamon Toast Crunch that combined its cinnamon-sugar flavor with a spicy pepper sensation. Unlike the original cereal, the product was marketed primarily as a snack and sold in a 5.9-ounce resealable pouch. It was initially made available exclusively online through Walmart beginning August 12, 2022.

In November 2022, General Mills introduced Cinnamon Toast Crunch Minis, a smaller version of the cereal featuring round pieces instead of the original square shape.

== Contamination incidents ==
On March 22, 2021, American writer, rapper and podcaster Jensen Karp found what appeared to be discarded shrimp tails in his Cinnamon Toast Crunch cereal; his tweets about the incident went viral. Additionally, Karp found a piece of string, "small black pieces" embedded into some pieces of the cereal, and an object which looked like a pea. General Mills then issued a statement on Twitter claiming the tails were "an accumulation of the cinnamon sugar that sometimes can occur when ingredients aren't thoroughly blended". General Mills later claimed they were investigating the case, but that contamination "did not occur at [their] facility".

The incident was covered internationally by multiple major news outlets, who were critical of the company's response.

A recall incident occurred in June of 2013, where cinnamon toast products were potentially affected by salmonella. This action was taken as a precaution because the company was notified by an ingredient supplier that it had recalled an ingredient due to the possible presence of salmonella. No illnesses had been associated with this finding. Customers and food service operators were advised to throw the cereal away and contact General Mills. General Mills did state there was no illness at the time of the recall.

== See also ==
- List of breakfast cereals
- Fitness (cereal)
