= The Kid in You =

The Kid in You is an advertising slogan developed for Kellogg's Frosted Mini-Wheats by the Leo Burnett Agency in the mid-1980s. The slogan was aimed at adults who were concerned with their perceived maturity but still wanted a sweet tasting children's cereal.

== Overview ==
"The Kid in You" campaign, started in 1984, proved to be a brilliant response to demographic challenges facing the breakfast cereal industry in the 1980s. As baby boomers aged and consumers showed an increasing interest in nutritious alternatives to the heavily sweetened, child-oriented cereals that had driven growth for two decades, the breakfast cereal market became more complex and segmented. To maintain its lead in the industry, the Kellogg Company had to respond to the gap in the adult cereal market. It positioned Frosted Mini-Wheats as a product with broad-based appeal. The campaign was aimed at adults whose maturity made them concerned about nutrition but whose taste buds still craved flavor. Considered by critics to be a clever and appealing approach, the strategy was quite successful, and led to Frosted Mini-Wheats becoming one of the best-selling cereals in the United States.

== Historical context ==
In the 1960s, Kellogg's success with presweetened cereal brands remained high, and consistently strong brands such as Corn Flakes indicated that a solid market existed for basic cereals as well. Sugar Frosted Mini-Wheats, introduced in 1969, was a product that offered the fundamental nutrition of shredded wheat with the added appeal of sweet taste. The brand, with 'sugar' eventually removed from its name, became Kellogg's anchor product in the growing wheat biscuit category.

Consumer developments in the late 1970s and early 1980s further affected the cereal industry. Parents and other advocates for children began to complain about the negative effects of sugary cereals and linked children's consumption of presweetened cereals to obesity and tooth decay. Demanding accurate information about product contents, many consumers were dismayed to learn that sugar was the main ingredient in some of these cereals. Medical studies suggesting a relationship between diet and heart disease and cancer helped to stimulate increased interest in basic nutrition and natural foods, including such products as oat bran and whole-grain fiber. In response, cereal manufacturers rushed out oat bran cereals and other products aimed at a health-conscious market. By the early 1980s, cereal companies were responding to consumer preferences that had become complex and specialized. As a product that appealed to both adults and children, Frosted Mini-Wheats was a brand that could remain on pantry shelves even after children had moved away from home.

== Target market ==
Children under the age of 17 consume the most cereal per capita. Adults (25-49) by contrast consume approximately half as much. As the baby-boom market aged during the early 1980s, Kellogg's saw its market share decline dramatically. To reverse this trend, Kellogg's believed it had to convince adults to eat more cereal. When they were children, the approximately 75 million adults of this generation had fueled the industry's huge growth. But the adult market had become segmented, primarily into two groups, one concerned with high-fiber cereals with no added sugar, and the other interested in flavor and willing to accept a small amount of added sugar. With Frosted Mini-Wheats, Kellogg's claimed that consumers now did not have to make a choice between healthiness and flavor.

== Marketing strategy ==
In response to changing consumer patterns and industry trends, Kellogg's announced a major "back to basics" marketing strategy in 1984. A principal component of this strategy was an increase in advertising dollars, a development the company had begun earlier in the decade. Kellogg's also planned new creative approaches to its advertising. Although it shifted advertising for some of its brands to J. Walter Thompson, it kept Frosted Mini-Wheats with its long-standing agency, Leo Burnett.

To convince middle-aged consumers to eat more Frosted Mini-Wheats, Leo Burnett created a television commercial campaign for prime time. Burnett's strategy combined humor and nostalgia. The television spots presented Frosted Mini-Wheats as a product that could appeal to both sides of a typical adult: the rational side concerned with nutrition and fiber, and the juvenile side attracted to sweet flavor. The "Kid in You" were meant to remind viewers of how much they had enjoyed Frosted Mini-Wheats as children and suggested that it was permissible for serious adults to indulge in their childhood tastes.

== Outcome ==
Kellogg's considered Burnett's approach for Frosted Mini-Wheats to be a resounding success. Between 1990 and 1994, the brand doubled in sales and, by 1994, was ranked the number three cereal in the United States.
