= Staverton Mill =

Cereal factory and former woollen mill

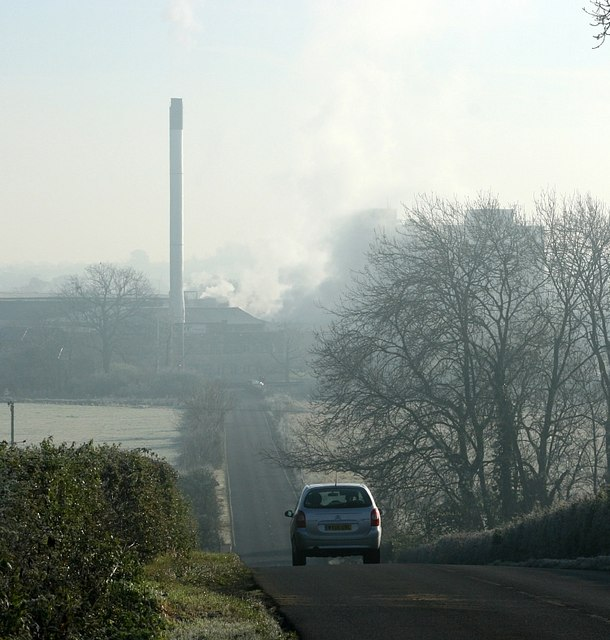
- The mill and chimney in 2007

- Location within Wiltshire

General information
- Location: Staverton, Wiltshire, England
- Coordinates: 51.347°N 2.206°W

Staverton Mill is an historic woollen mill and now a cereal factory on the River Avon in the village of Staverton near Trowbridge, Wiltshire, England.

== History ==
A mill is first mentioned in Domesday Book at Stavretone. By the end of the 14th century it had become a fulling mill to meet the burgeoning demand for woollen broadcloth, with a stone weir to control flow to the water wheels.

About 1800, the old mill was bought by John Jones, who replaced the old building. In July 1802 the mill, called the "Staverton Superfine Woollen Manufactory" was attacked as part of a series of disputes about pay. By 1813, Staverton mill had 40 looms. After a fire in 1824, further rebuilding resulted in a six-storey building.

In 1897, the site was sold to the Anglo-Swiss Condensed Milk Co. to facilitate expansion of their condensed milk production, after which the top two stories of the mill were removed and the building became offices, a canteen and stores. The new owners replaced the water wheel with a 43 horsepower (32 kW) vortex water turbine and installed equipment including 6-foot (1.8 m) copper vacuum pans, coolers, heaters and a basic filling and packing line.

The 19th-century mill chimney was replaced in 1913 when the boiler house was modernised. The new chimney was built in brick by the German firm Alphons Custodis, was 172 feet high with a 6 ft 6in diameter, and cost £1,056 to construct. There was a cast-iron water tank built by Dortmund around the chimney, halfway up its height.

The factory's output was sent by rail from Holt Junction station, some 1 1/2 miles (2.4 km) distant by road. A large covered loading bay was built at the station in 1909, which remained in use until 1934 when the factory gained a direct connection to the railway.

Anglo-Swiss Condensed Milk Co. became Nestlé in December 1935 and by 1936 local farmers were supplying more than 5,000,000 imperial gallons (23,000,000 L; 6,000,000 US gal) of milk per annum to be condensed at the mill. A new manufacturing block was constructed on the site in 1935 to improve efficiency, and the top four stories of the mill building's original six were demolished. Two years later, the workforce had increased to 255. The site is labelled "Staverton Condenser" on an Ordnance Survey map published in 1958.

=== Later 20th century ===
In 1967 a new plant known as the "baked bean factory" was built on the site for Crosse & Blackwell at a cost of £750,000. The milk cannery closed in 1972 and was refitted as a yoghurt manufacturing plant, dovetailing with Nestlé's 1978 acquisition of the Chambourcy brand. By 1980 the factory was producing 72 million pots of yoghurt per annum.

Nestlé produced cans on the site for many years, for the milk plant and later for the bean factory, which produced cans of baked beans and pasta in sauce (sold under their own label and for supermarket own-brands). The can manufacturing unit was closed on the site in 1989, as cans could be procured from Metal Box more cheaply than they could be made, and Nestlé as a whole moved away from over a century of can-making (except for odd sizes e.g. for catering coffee and milk powder, which continued to be made at Dalston, near Carlisle).

The brick chimney was a local landmark for much of the century, but was demolished in 1989 and replaced with a much taller metal stack. The Cross & Blackwell factory closed in 1995 and the site was transferred to Cereal Partners, a joint venture between General Mills and Nestlé, which makes breakfast cereals.

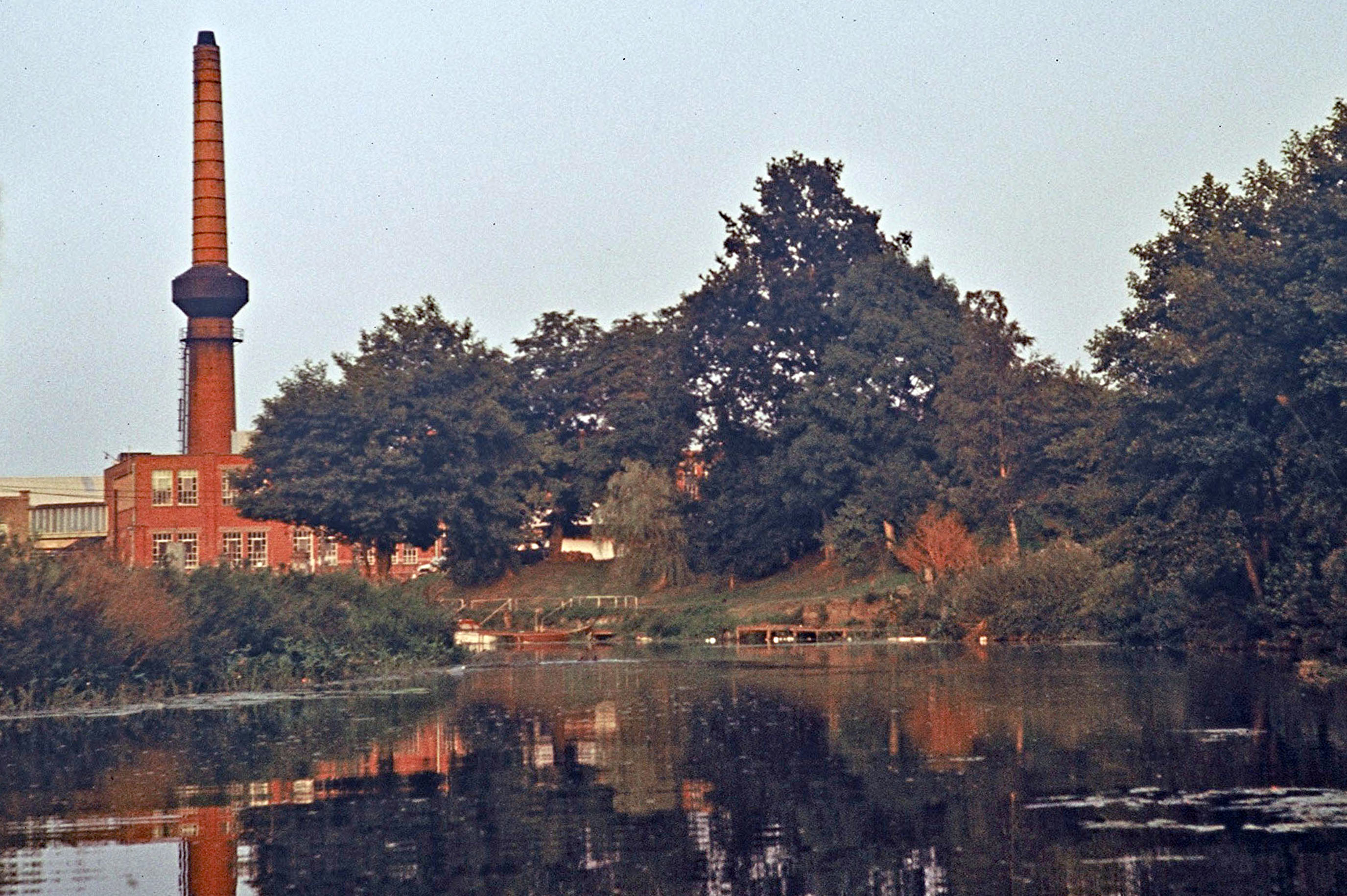
Staverton Mill in 1984, showing the brick chimney

=== 21st century ===
The Nestlé desserts factory closed in 2004, allowing the site to concentrate on wheat-based cereals. Production of Shredded Wheat and Shreddies was moved from a Welwyn Garden City factory in 2007, and in 2014 those were still the main products. The metal chimney was removed in 2011, as it was not required by the cereal-making plant.
