= French Toast Crunch =

Breakfast cereal made by General Mills

- Product type: Cereal
- Current owner: General Mills
- Country: U.S.
- Introduced: 1996; 30 years ago (first run); December 5, 2014; 11 years ago (reintroduction)
- Discontinued: 2006; 20 years ago (first run)
- Markets: U.S.
- Website: www.blog.generalmills.com/2014/12/weve-got-big-news-about-french-toast-crunch/

French Toast Crunch is a breakfast cereal launched in the mid-1990s, flavored to taste like French toast, by the General Mills company. The cereal pieces originally looked like mini slices of French toast, but General Mills changed the cereal to a style similar in appearance to Cinnamon Toast Crunch; a thin, wavy square sprinkled with cinnamon and sugar flavoring. General Mills later reintroduced the original design.

In 2006, General Mills discontinued French Toast Crunch in the United States. Popular demand led General Mills to reintroduce the product on December 5, 2014.

During this time, French Toast Crunch was, and still is, produced and marketed in Canada as "French Toast Crunch" and "Croque pain doré." Canadian French Toast Crunch is made in the original recipe and form (mini French toast).

== History ==
The product was advertised for sale in the United States at least as early as December 1994, although media coverage suggests it was launched in mid-October or mid-November 1996.

French Toast Crunch has been described as crispy, sweetened corn cereal. The cereal pieces resembled tiny pieces of toast initially, and later became curved square pieces, as in its sister cereal, Cinnamon Toast Crunch.

On the back of the original French Toast Crunch cereal boxes, they discussed how the baking cartoon mascot, Wendell, created French Toast Crunch. The back of the box reads:

"New French Toast Crunch - for a taste that will have you flipping! Wendell has cooked up an awesome new cereal with all the stuff you love. Delicious French toast cereal with syrup specially baked onto every crunchy piece. And each scrumptious piece looks and tastes like French toast! Grab your spoon, and discover this crunchy sensation - For a taste that will have you flipping."

== Advertisement ==
TV commercials would ask questions regarding "What makes French Toast Crunch?" This question was answered with the following detailed response:

"French Toast Crunch cereal... with a new syrup taste. Sweet syrup flavor over squares that crunch. An outrageous part of a good breakfast. French Toast Crunch... the taste you can see!"

== Discontinuation and relaunch ==
In 2006, French Toast Crunch was discontinued in the United States, but remained available in Canada and Australia.

On December 5, 2014, General Mills announced that they would return French Toast Crunch to nationwide production in the United States starting at the end of January 2015, with the cereal being available at selected supermarkets and retailers at this point in time. The design of the cereal flakes was reverted to the original style of miniature pieces of toast rather than plain squares.

In a statement posted on the General Mills website, they had the following to say about the cereal's return:

"We have been overwhelmed by the consumer conversations, requests and passion for the cereal to come back. We value our fans and are so excited to be able to bring it back for them."

== See also ==
- List of breakfast cereals
