= Cereal Partners Worldwide =

Joint venture between General Mills and Nestlé

Cereal Partners Worldwide S.A.
- Type: Joint venture
- Industry: Food processing
- Founded: 1990
- Headquarters: Lausanne, Switzerland
- Area served: Worldwide (excluding the United States and Canada)
- Products: Breakfast cereals
- Owners: Nestlé (50%); General Mills (50%)

Cereal Partners Worldwide S.A. is a joint venture between General Mills and Nestlé, established in 1990 to produce breakfast cereals. The company is headquartered in Lausanne, Switzerland, and markets cereals in more than 130 countries (except for the U.S. and Canada, where General Mills markets the cereals directly).

== History ==
The company's cereals are sold under the Nestlé brand, although many originated from General Mills and some, such as Shredded Wheat and Shreddies, were once made by Nabisco. Some of CPW's products are sold under the Uncle Tobys brand in Australia and New Zealand. In 2022, the company started selling cereals under the General Mills brand but some cereal brands like Trix still continue to have the Nestlé brand.

== Products ==
Breakfast cereals produced by Cereal Partners include:

- Cheerios
  - Honey Cheerios
- Chocapic
- Cookie Crisp
- Curiously Cinnamon
- Fitness
- Golden Grahams
- Golden Nuggets
- Lion Cereal
- Lucky Charms
- Nesquik
- Shreddies
- Shredded Wheat
- Trix
