= Frosted Mini-Wheats =

Breakfast cereal made by WK Kellogg Co

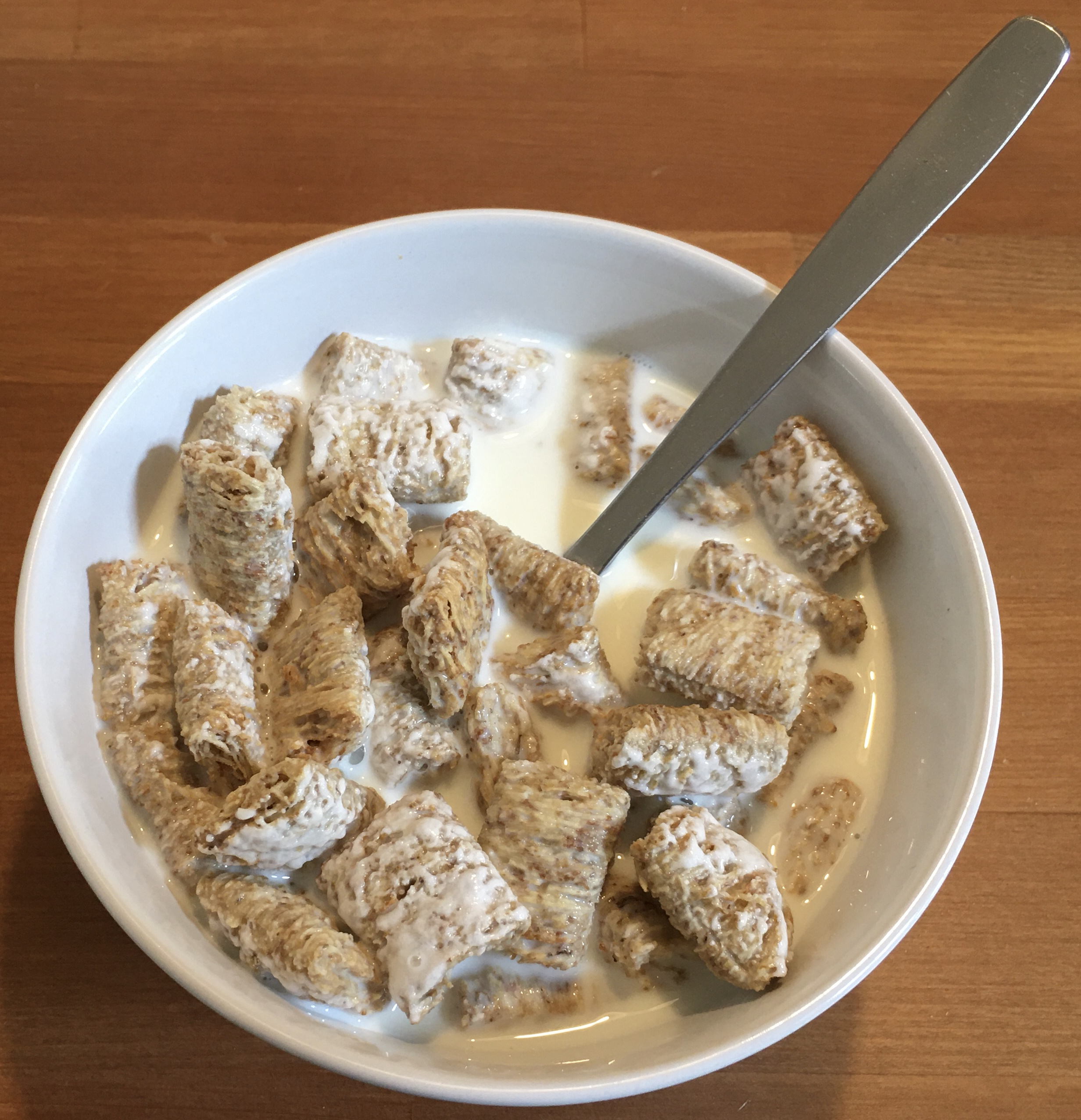
- Kellogg's Frosted Mini Wheats – Whole Grain Cereal, with milk
- Product type: Breakfast cereal
- Current owner: WK Kellogg Co
- Country: United States
- Introduced: 1969; 57 years ago
- Related brands: Frosted Flakes
- Previous owners: Kellogg's (1969–2023)
- Tagline: "Keeps them full. Keeps them focused"
- Website: frostedminiwheats.com

Frosted Mini-Wheats (also known as Frosted Wheats and Mini Max in the United Kingdom, Mini-Wheats! in Canada, and Toppas in certain European countries; also referred to as Mini-Wheats in the United States) is a breakfast cereal manufactured by WK Kellogg Co (formerly Kellogg's) consisting of shredded wheat cereal pieces and frosting. It is made primarily from whole-grain wheat and has been marketed as a high-fiber cereal.

== History ==
Kellogg introduced Frosted Mini-Wheats in the United States in 1969 as a large size portion that was available in regular and brown sugar/cinnamon flavor, later followed by a bite-size portion introduced in 1980. The original large size Mini-Wheats was renamed "Big Bite" by 2001 and discontinued entirely in 2015. In 1999, Kellogg's went into the line by introducing a non-frosted Mini-Wheats variety that contained raisin filling, replacing Raisin Squares. It was discontinued in two years. Frosted Wheats were available from the 1980s until the early 1990s in the United Kingdom under the Toppas name. They subsequently disappeared from shop shelves but were reissued several years later under the Frosted Wheats brand, similar to that used elsewhere in the world. The new cereal uses far smaller pieces of frosted wheat parcel than the original Toppas and contains beef gelatin. Initially Kellogg's Mini-Wheats were available without the sugar frosting and with raisins or blueberries in the center. The Mini-Wheats recipe when produced in Canada or the United States was slightly different. Since January 2008, Canadian-produced (plant in Belleville, Ontario) Mini-Wheats are available in Canada and are imported into the US.

In 2009, the U.S. Federal Trade Commission (FTC) took action against Kellogg for advertising claims that Frosted Mini-Wheats improved children's attentiveness by "nearly 20%." The FTC alleged the claim overstated the results of the underlying study, which showed a smaller and more conditional effect. Kellogg agreed to drop the claim in future advertising and settle the matter without admitting wrongdoing.

In October 2012, Kellogg issued a voluntary recall of approximately 2.8-3.2 million packages of Frosted Mini-Wheats Bite Size Original and Bite Size Unfrosted cereal in the United States, Canada, and Mexico after the potential presence of flexible metal mesh fragments from a manufacturing component was discovered. The affected products were identified by specific "best if used by" date codes and production identifiers, and the company emphasized that the issue was limited to certain batches and that no injuries had been reported at the time of the recall.

Following the 2023 separation of Kellogg's North American cereal business, Frosted Mini-Wheats became a product of WK Kellogg Co. Current varieties include Original, Strawberry, Blueberry, Cocoa, and Little Bites, all made primarily from whole-grain wheat and marketed as high-fiber cereals.

== Advertising ==
=== United States ===
Frosted Mini-Wheats are marketed in several ways. There was a short stint of television advertisements featuring a Frosted Mini-Wheat biscuit with "split personalities;" the sweet (frosted) side and wheat (shredded grain) side, who argued over who was more popular. When the new MyPyramid debuted, launching the whole grain craze, Frosted Mini Wheats enjoyed another short-lived advertising stint as a fiber-conscious cereal. These advertisements involved a man walking around, asking "Have you had your fiber today?", then handing unsuspecting, confused people a bowl of the cereal. However, these ads have been discontinued. Meanwhile, in the early/mid-1990s, several ads aired showcasing conflict between children raving about the frosting and adults raving about the whole grain wheat. The best-known of these, "The Kid in You" ads, feature adults turning into children and kids turning into adults (actress Marcia Wallace appears in one of those "Kid in Us" spots, and one used the famous line from When Harry Met Sally..., "I'll have what she's having", which was said by an elderly woman sitting next to a young businesswoman who turned into a 13-year-old girl in front of her).

Current advertising involves Frosted Mini-Wheats helping children in various childhood situations. In one, a girl in a spelling bee retracts a letter after speaking it and passes, despite the fact that it is against the rules in an actual Spelling Bee competition. Another has the Mini-Wheat helping a girl keep time to a dance in a school play. It promotes eating breakfast in general. The tagline says, "Keeps 'em [your kids] full, and keeps 'em focused." The Federal Trade Commission found fault with Kellogg's claims that Frosted Mini-Wheats cereal improved kids' attentiveness by nearly 20%. The consumer protection agency said that Kellogg's had misrepresented a study and violated federal law.

In 2009, Kelloggs introduced a "Little Bites" spinoff of the Mini-Wheats brand. This version had smaller squares and came in three flavors: Original, Chocolate, and Honey Nut. Eventually, the Honey Nut flavor was taken off of shelves and replaced with Cinnamon Roll, which was also short-lived.

In 2011, Kelloggs introduced Frosted Mini-Wheats with Fruit in the Middle, which features strawberries and blueberries in the center. These are similar to the original Strawberry Mini-Wheats that Kellogg's sold in the 1990s which contained strawberry filling in the middle, as well as Raisin Squares and its successor Mini-Wheats Raisin, and Fruit Wheats, a variant of Nabisco Shredded Wheat made in the 1980s.

=== Canada ===
An ad for Mini-Wheats that aired in Canada in the early-1990s featured an animated "Mr. Mini-Wheat" (voiced by John Stocker) about to go on a blind date. After experiencing some pre-date anxiety, a disembodied voice convinces Mr. Mini-Wheat that between his wholesome wheatiness and his frosted side, he has much to offer. Now quite confident, Mr. Mini-Wheat sets off for his date, proclaiming that "She'll be my love slave forever!". This line was quickly changed to "She'll be my true love forever!" for later airings.

More recently, an advertisement for Vanilla flavored Mini-Wheats featured an animated Mr. Mini-Wheat singing and dancing to a tune based on "Agadoo" by Black Lace.

== Varieties ==
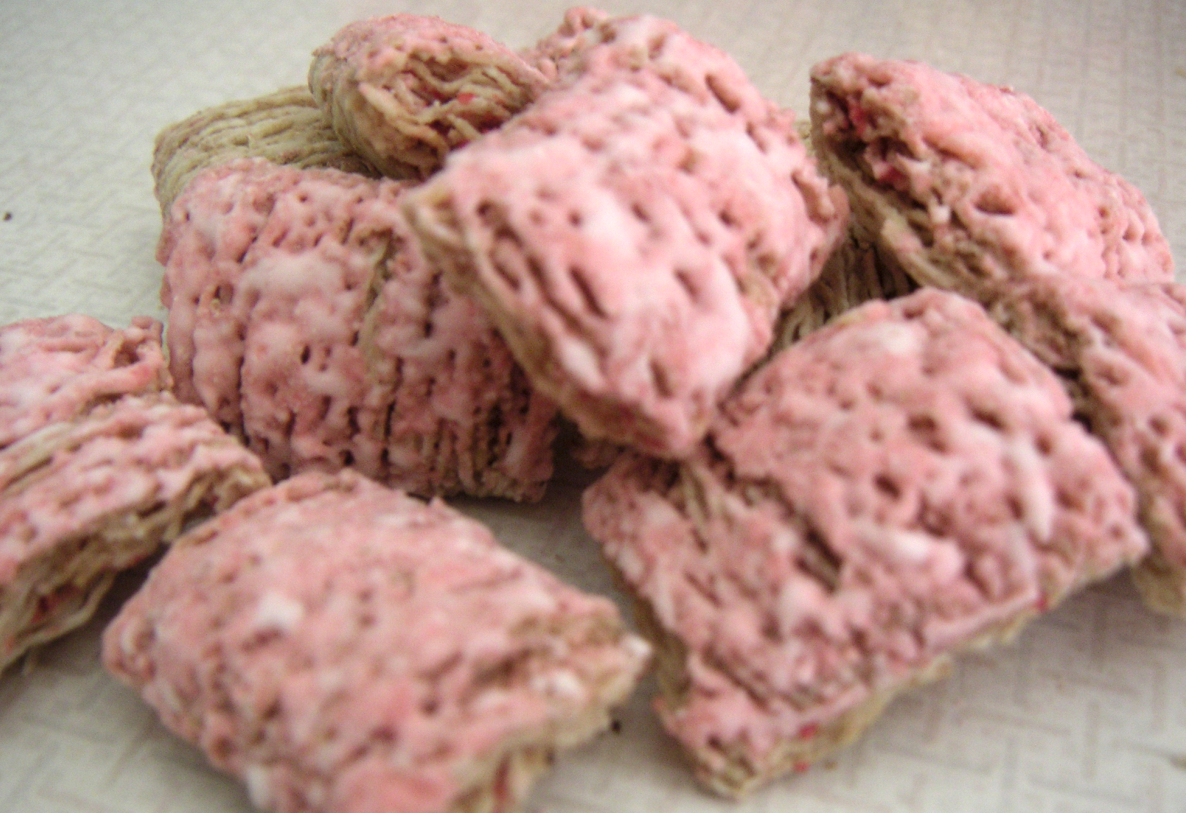
Bite Size Frosted Strawberry Delight

Frosted Mini-Wheats currently come in the following varieties:

- Bite Size Frosted Maple Brown Sugar
- Bite Size Frosted Blueberry (formerly named Blueberry Muffin)
- Bite Size Frosted Original
- Bite Size Pumpkin Spice (seasonal)
- Bite Size Frosted Strawberry (formerly named Strawberry Delight)
- Unfrosted Mini-Wheats
- Little Bites Original
- Little Bites Chocolate (discontinued in the US in 2023)
- Touch of Fruit in the Middle Raspberry (US)
- Centres Mixed Berry (Canada)

The following varieties have been discontinued:

- Bite Size Frosted Apple (served in the 80's)
- Bite Size Frosted Vanilla Creme (2006-2009)
- Bite Size Frosted Cinnamon Streusel
- Bite Size Frosted Chocolate
- Frosted Mini-Wheats Big Bite (2015)
- Crunch Brown Sugar (2013)
- Harvest Delight Cranberry
- Harvest Delight Blueberry
- Little Bites Honey Nut (discontinued in 2010)
- Little Bites Cinnamon Roll (introduced February 2012)
- Touch of Fruit in the Middle Mixed Berry (US)
- Touch of Fruit in the Middle Raisin (US, 2014)
- Touch of Fruit in the Middle Strawberry (served in the 90s)
- Mini wheats Dark Chocolate

== Ingredients ==
Frosted Mini-Wheats contains whole grain wheat, sugar and gelatin. Since Frosted Mini-Wheats contains gelatin, it is not vegetarian (gelatin is made from collagen which comes from animal bones and fat). By 2012, brown rice sugar was added to the list of ingredients.

== Recalls ==
There was a voluntary recall of certain Frosted Mini-Wheats products in October 2012 due to possible presence of metal fragments from a faulty Kellogg's manufacturing plant.
