= Shreddies =

Breakfast cereal made from wheat

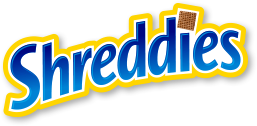
- Logo of the Canadian version

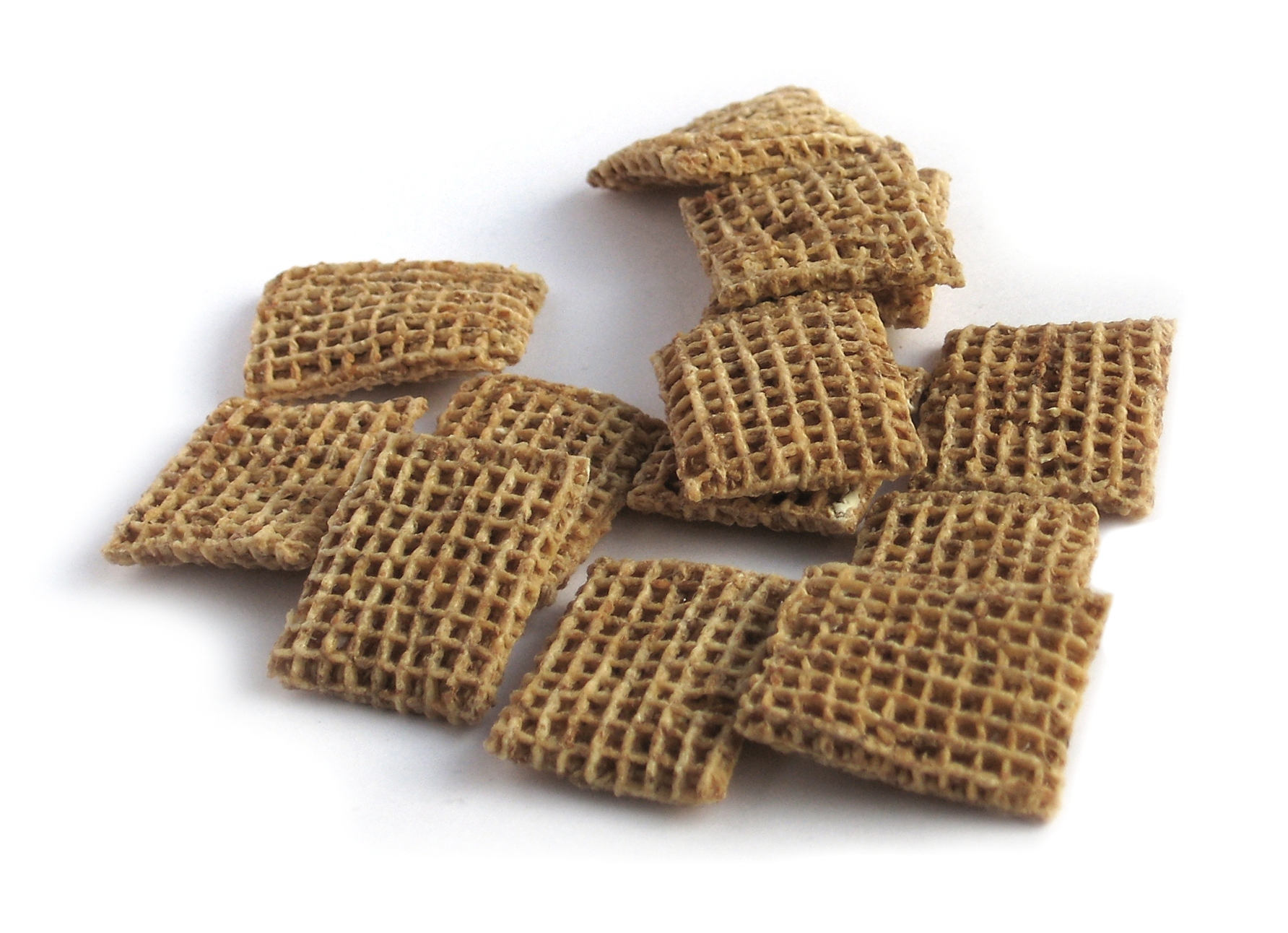
- Product type: Breakfast cereal
- Current owner: Post Consumer Brands
- Produced by: Post Consumer (Canada); Nestlé (through Cereal Partners) (UK, Ireland)
- Country: Canada
- Introduced: 1939; 87 years ago
- Previous owners: Nabisco
- Website: postbrands.com/shreddies Canada; UK, Ireland

Shreddies are a breakfast cereal marketed in Canada, the United Kingdom, and Ireland. It was first produced in Canada in 1939 by Nabisco. The Shreddies brand is held by Post Consumer Brands in Canada, and Cereal Partners under the Nestlé brand name in the United Kingdom and Ireland.

== History ==
In Canada, production began in 1939 at a food manufacturing plant in Lewis Avenue, Niagara Falls, Ontario. As of 2024, this plant was still in operation.

Shreddies were produced under the Nabisco name (Nabisco would also eventually merge into Kraft in 2000) until the brand in Canada was purchased in 1993 by Post Cereals, whose parent company in 1995 became Kraft General Foods, which sold Post to Ralcorp in 2008 and is now Post Foods Canada Corp., a unit of Post Holdings, which was spun off from Ralcorp in 2012.

In the United Kingdom, the cereal was first produced by Nabisco's former UK division but was later made by Cereal Partners under the Nestlé brand at a factory in Welwyn Garden City. The factory opened in 1926 and began making Shreddies in 1953. The site was briefly owned by Rank Hovis McDougall in 1988, which sold it to Cereal Partners in 1990. Nestlé's site at Staverton, Wiltshire started making Shreddies in 1998, and all production was moved there in 2007.

== Content and manufacture ==
In the UK, Shreddies consist mainly of whole grain wheat (96.2%), with sugar, invert sugar syrup, barley malt extract, molasses, and salt added for sweetness and flavour. Nutritional additives are iron, vitamin B3, B5, B9, B6, B2.

== Marketing ==
In 2005, Shreddies were advertised as "school fuel". The advertisements showed schoolchildren being focused on their work at school after eating a bowl of Shreddies for breakfast at home. This TV advertisement was ordered to be removed by the UK Advertising Standards Authority as it was held to provide an unfair comparison between school children eating Shreddies or eating nothing, rather than a similar cereal.

In 2008, an award-winning advertising campaign in Canada was created by created Ogilvy and Mather, co-written by Tim Piper, for "Diamond Shreddies", the same square product rotated 45 degrees. The ad won the Grand Clio and Cannes awards.

In January 2012, boxes of Shreddies dating from the early 1970s were reported to be selling on eBay, after being discovered in a village shop. They were reported to have been selling for about £160 per box.

Recreating Shreddies featured as a challenge in Channel 4's Snackmasters programme in 2019, featuring chefs Daniel Clifford and Claude Bosi.

== See also ==
- Chex
- List of breakfast cereals
- Shredded wheat
