= Golden Grahams =

Breakfast cereal made by Cereal Partners

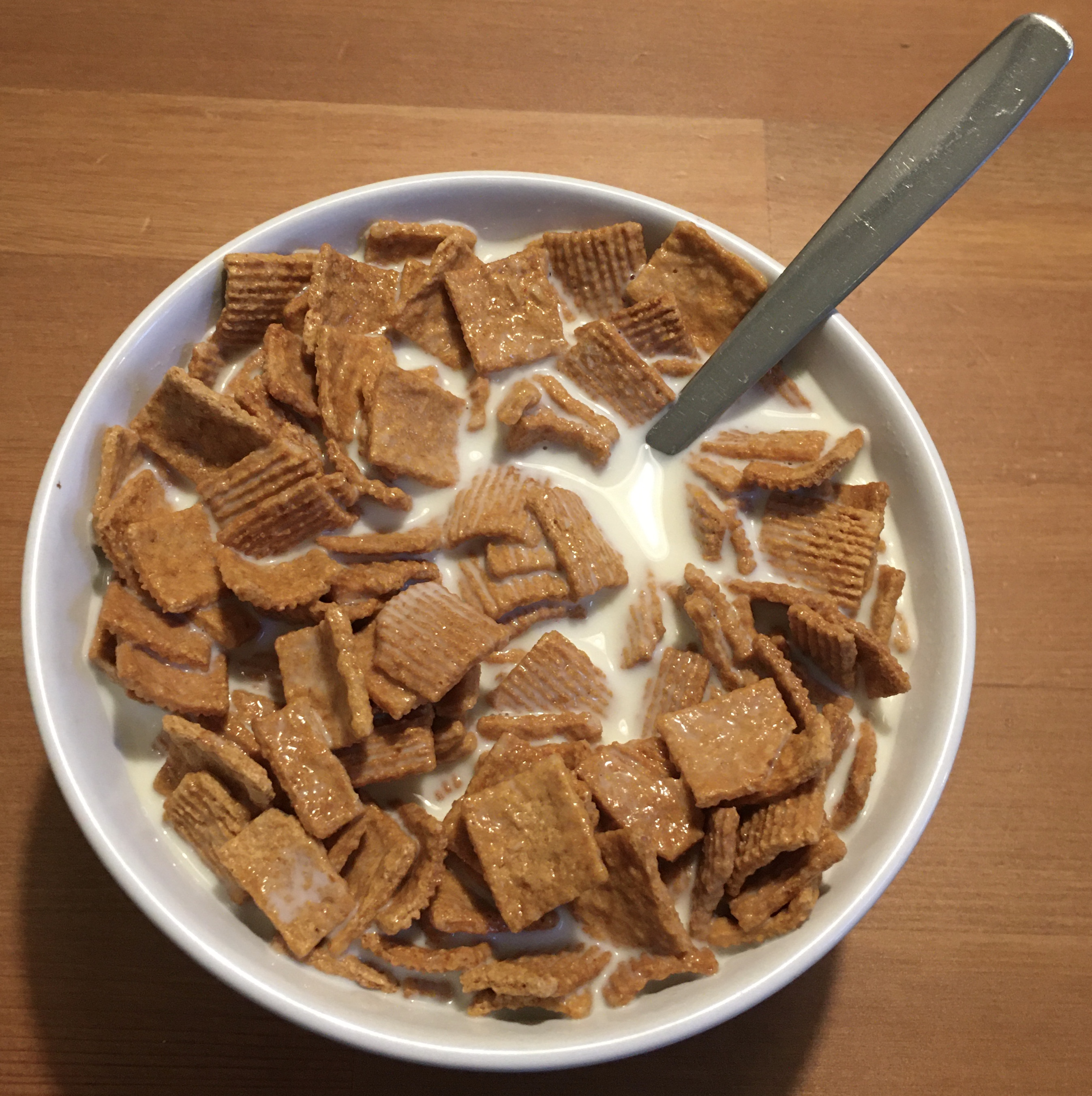
- Golden Grahams cereal, with milk
- Product type: Breakfast cereal
- Current owner: General Mills
- Produced by: General Mills (US & Canada); Nestlé (outside US)
- Country: United States
- Introduced: 1976; 50 years ago
- Website: generalmills.com/golden-grahams

Golden Grahams is a breakfast cereal produced in the United States and Canada by General Mills and Cereal Partners under the Nestlé brand in other countries.

== Overview ==
It consists of small toasted square-shaped cereal pieces made of whole wheat and corn. The taste is a mix of honey and brown sugar.

Golden Grahams was introduced in 1976, and the earliest TV commercials featured a jingle sung to the tune of the James A. Bland song "Oh, Dem Golden Slippers". The cereal is widely available in the United States, Canada, and some European markets.

=== United Kingdom ===
Golden Grahams reached the peak of their popularity in the United Kingdom in the 1980s and 1990s, however a gradual decline in sales led to their eventual discontinuation in the country in the early 2000s. In October 2010, Nestlé announced that the brand was to be reintroduced into British supermarkets. In 2021, Golden Grahams were discontinued for a second time, but were again reintroduced in 2025.

Golden Grahams sister brand, Curiously Cinnamon, which was formerly marketed as Cinnamon Grahams, has consistently remained available in the United Kingdom.

== See also ==
- List of breakfast cereals
