= Henry Perky =

American businessman, lawyer, and inventor (1843–1906)

Henry D. Perky

Henry Drushel Perky (December 7, 1843 – June 29, 1906) was a lawyer, businessman, promoter, and inventor. Perky is the inventor of shredded wheat.

== Early life ==
He was born in Saltcreek township, Holmes County, Ohio, the fifth son of Daniel Jefferson Perky (c. 1808–1862) and Magdalena Drushel (c. 1812–1911), both of Pennsylvania. He married his wife, Susanna Melissa Crow, (born 1845) on August 3, 1865, in Mount Hope, Ohio. He studied law and was admitted to the bar in Nebraska. He was elected to the Nebraska State Senate in 1868 when only twenty-five years old (although other sources suggest he represented the eighth district from 1874 to 1876). The couple lived at Omaha, Nebraska, and Wahoo, Nebraska, before 1880. Henry went to Colorado for his health in 1880 where he was an attorney for the Union Pacific Railroad. Sue followed from Wahoo later that same year, and in Denver, Colorado, she gave birth to their only surviving child, Scott Henry Perky (born 1880).

Scott H. Perky went on to be a writer; the life of his father was the subject of one of his books. In 1920, he developed a round shredded wheat cereal, which he named Muffets. The Muffets Corporation was sold to the Quaker Oats Company in 1927.

Perky was a vegetarian.

== Steel Car Company ==
In 1884, the assets – a patent and a half-finished car – of the bankrupt Robbins Cylindrical Steel Car Company were acquired by Byron A. Atkinson (born 1854), a well-to-do Boston furniture dealer with some background as a machinist. To promote his cylindrical steel rail passenger car, Atkinson hired Henry Perky, who had quite a reputation for making money during times that ruined other businessmen. Their firm was the Steel Car Company.

While the railcar was being built, Perky was busy trying to find a place to build a huge plant for building steel cars. He first proposed Chicago, Illinois, but when this did not generate significant interest, in 1888 he proposed Lincoln, Nebraska, and there the car would be named the "City of Lincoln". This idea too failed to catch on, so Perky moved on.

Perky finally found backing in St. Joseph, Missouri, and there, in late 1888, at a cost of some $70,000, he erected a building on a large plot of land east of the city "beyond Wyatt Park". He also organized an exposition, to be called the National Railway, Electric and Industrial Exposition, but more popularly known as the "New Era Exposition". The exposition was set up on the grounds of the Steel Car Company, with the western portion of its building as the main hall of the exposition.

On the night of September 15, 1889, a fire swept through the main building of the exposition. The ten cars being built, the Steel Car Company plant, and all the assets of the Steel Car Company were a total loss. Perky, not one to be easily discouraged, took the original Robbins car (that had been outfitted as a private car for Atkinson's personal use) for a transcontinental tour. Though it attracted a good deal of attention, it attracted no orders.

The cylindrical car was shown at the 1893 World's Columbian Exposition in Chicago, Illinois, but again attracted no orders. Although almost $40,000 had been spent on it, when the exposition closed, the railcar was abandoned on the fairgrounds and later sold by the firm that dismantled the Exposition.

== Shredded Wheat Company ==
In the early 1890s, at a Nebraska hotel, Perky, suffering from diarrhea, encountered a man similarly afflicted, who was eating boiled wheat with cream. The idea simmered in Perky's mind, and in 1892, he took his idea of a product made of boiled wheat to his friend, William H. Ford, in Watertown, New York — a machinist by trade. Here they developed the machine for making what Perky called "little whole wheat mattresses", known as shredded wheat. They presented the machine at the 1893 Columbian Exposition, probably while Perky was trying to attract buyers for his cylindrical steel rail passenger car.

His original intention was to sell the machines, not the biscuits. He returned to Denver and began distributing the biscuits from a horse-drawn wagon in an attempt to popularize the idea. There he founded the Cereal Machine Company. Perky received United States Patent Number 548,086, dated October 15, 1895.

The biscuits proved more popular than the machines, so Perky moved east and opened a bakery in Boston, Massachusetts, and then in Worcester, Massachusetts, in 1895, retaining the name of the Cereal Machine Company and adding the name Shredded Wheat Company.

Whether he developed his ideas on nutrition before the machine or after, Perky was a food faddist who believed the fundamental issue was how to nourish a man so that his condition will be natural. Although John Harvey Kellogg and Charles William Post are better known, Perky was a pioneer of the "cookless breakfast food"and he was the first to mass-produce and nationally distribute ready-to-eat cereal. By 1898, shredded wheat was being sold in North and South America and Europe.

In 1901, drawn by the idea of inexpensive electrical power for baking, and the natural draw of a popular tourist attraction, he hired Edward A. Deeds to build a new plant at Niagara Falls, New York. Deeds became a director of the National Food Company. Perky invited a large number of notables to a special luncheon. Canadian author Pierre Berton describes the bill of fare: "a Shredded Wheat drink, Shredded Wheat biscuit toast, roast turkey stuffed with Shredded Wheat, and Shredded Wheat ice cream". The factory itself was called the "Palace of Light" and was white-tiled, air-conditioned, well-lit with floor-to-ceiling windows, and equipped with showers, lunchrooms (a free lunch for women – men had to pay 10¢), and auditoriums for the employees. It had a roof garden with a view of the falls. A representation of the factory appeared on the Shredded Wheat boxes for decades.

== Retirement ==
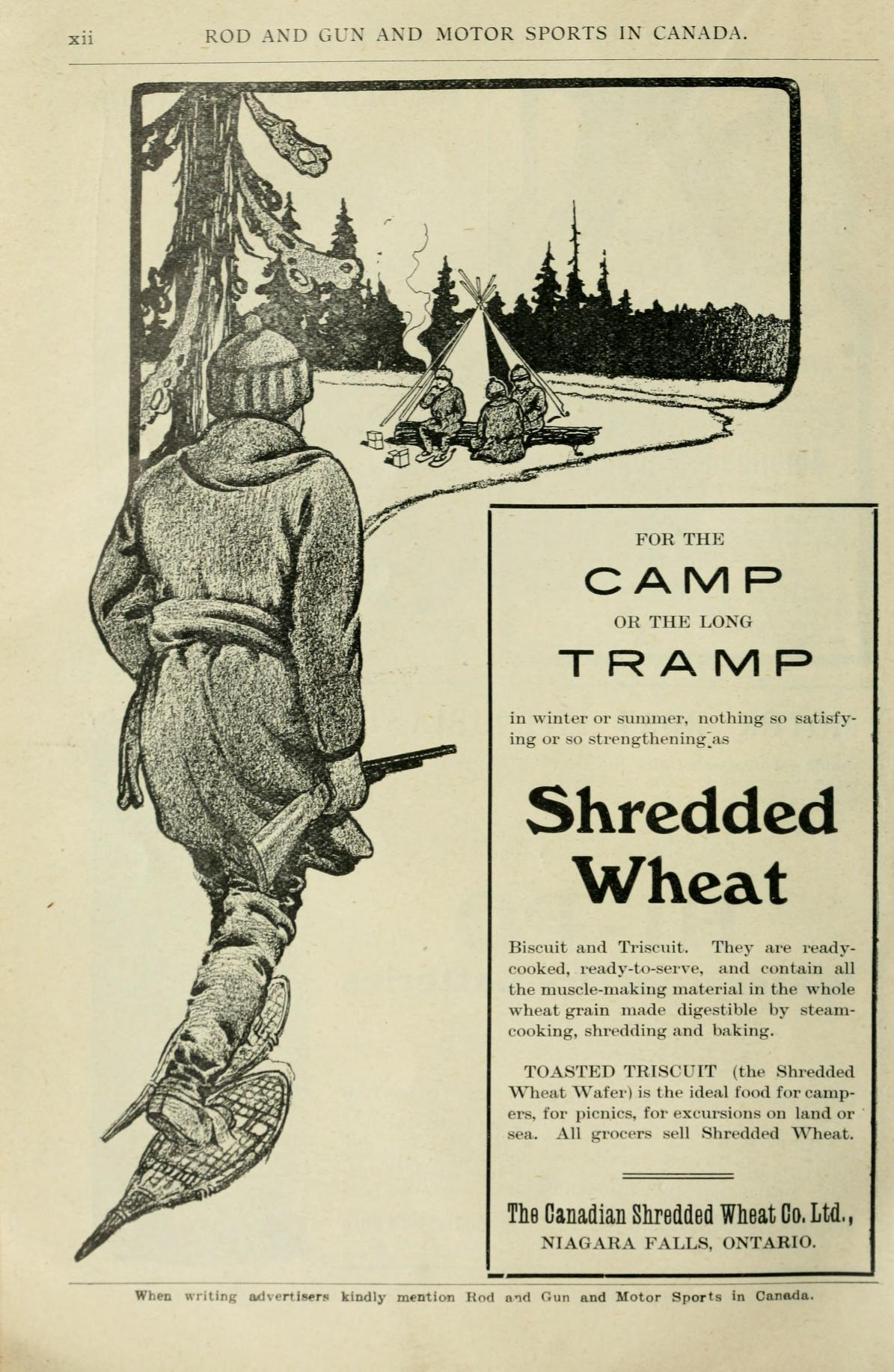
Canadian Shredded Wheat advertisement

In 1902, Perky retired from the company and disposed of his interest. He published a book on nutrition and oral hygiene, Wisdom vs. Foolishness, that went through at least ten editions. Having made his fortune, the following year Perky arrived in Glencoe, Maryland, and began purchasing large tracts of land in the region. His dream was to build a boarding school for men and women that would offer an innovative curriculum of scientific farming and domestic science subjects free of tuition. The main building was completed, elaborate brochures were printed, and a few students had enrolled. The plans for the dedication were in place when Perky died days before the grand opening, and the O'Read School never opened.

Henry D. Perky died on June 29, 1906, at his farm in Glencoe. His obituary stated that he had been ill for a long time and that a fall from a horse a month earlier had hastened his death. He is buried in Glencoe, Maryland.

== Shredded Wheat Company sold to Nabisco ==
In 1908, the company again took the name of the Shredded Wheat Company, and another factory was built in Niagara Falls. A third plant was added in Niagara Falls, Ontario, in 1904, known as the Canadian Shredded Wheat Company. By 1915 the Pacific Coast Shredded Wheat Company had been added in Oakland, California, and by 1925, a factory in Welwyn Garden City, England, had joined the family.

In December 1928, the company was sold to National Biscuit Company. The product name became Nabisco Shredded Wheat circa 1941. Production of Shredded Wheat was begun in Naperville, Illinois in 1970. All other plants remained in operation until 1954, when the original "Palace of Light" was shuttered.

== Patents ==
- U.S. patent 502,378 – Machine for the Preparation of Cereals for Food, granted August 1, 1893
- U.S. patent 520,496 – Machine for the Manufacture of Food Products from Cereals, granted May 29, 1894
- U.S. patent 521,810 – Machine for the Manufacture of Food Products from Cereals, granted June 26, 1894
- U.S. patent 532,286 – Receiving-Trough and Cutter for Cereal-Reducing Machines, granted January 8, 1895
- U.S. patent 532,481 – Perforated-Roll Machine for Reducing Cereals for Food, granted January 15, 1895
- U.S. patent 532,697 – Roll-Machine for Reducing Cereals for Food, granted January 15, 1895
- U.S. patent 532,698 – Groove-Roll Machine for Reducing Cereals for Food, granted January 15, 1895
- U.S. patent 533,551, U.S. patent 533,552, U.S. patent 533,553, U.S. patent 533,554 – Roll-Machine for Reducing Cereals for Food, granted February 5, 1895
- U.S. patent 533,555 – Machine for Reduction and Preparation of Cereals for Food, granted February 5, 1895
- U.S. patent D24688 – Design for a Biscuit, issued September 17, 1895
- U.S. patent 548,086 – Bread and Method of Preparing Same, granted October 15, 1895
- U.S. patent 548,087 – Apparatus for Preparing Grain for Reducing-Machines, granted October 15, 1895
- U.S. patent D25318 – Design for a Cereal Cup, issued March 31, 1896
- U.S. patent 571,284 – Machine for Reducing and Preparing Cereals for Food, granted November 10, 1896
- U.S. patent 571,285 – Machine for Reducing Cereals, granted November 10, 1896
- U.S. patent 575,983 – Coffee-Roaster, granted January 26, 1897
- U.S. patent 598,745 – Roll Reducing-Machine for Preparing Food, granted February 8, 1898
- U.S. patent D28785 – Design for a Wafer, issued June 7, 1898
- U.S. patent 611,504 – Game Apparatus, granted September 27, 1898
- U.S. patent 614,338 – Machine for Reducing Cereal Food Products to Form for Use, granted November 15, 1898
- U.S. patent 618,288 – Apparatus for Making Folded Wafers, granted January 24, 1899
- U.S. patent 625,696 – Machine for Reducing and Baking Cereals in Form, granted May 23, 1899
- U.S. patent 667,892 – Apparatus for Manufacturing Cereals into Forms of Food or Bread, granted February 12, 1901
- U.S. patent 678,127 – Machine for Reducing Food Material to Form and Distributing Same, granted July 9, 1901
- U.S. patent 678,625 – Pneumatic Panning or Distributing Machine, granted July 16, 1901
- U.S. patent 681,655 – Continuous Heating and Baking Machine, granted August 27, 1901
- U.S. patent 681,656 – Continuous Cutting-Machine, granted August 27, 1901
- U.S. patent D35511 – Design for a Carton-Blank, issued December 31, 1901
- U.S. patent D36007 – Design for a Stove, issued August 12, 1902
- U.S. patent 713,795 – Filamentous Cracker, granted November 18, 1902
- U.S. patent 746,145 – Continuous Motion Heating and Evaporating Apparatus, granted December 8, 1903
- U.S. patent 747,475 – Stove, granted December 22, 1903
- U.S. patent 797,604 – Machine for Preparing Food, granted August 22, 1905

Posthumously granted:

- U.S. patent 878,154 – Machine for Manufacturing Cereal Biscuit, granted February 4, 1908
- U.S. patent 898,777 – Apparatus for Continuous Cooking, granted September 15, 1908
- U.S. patent 912,976 – Machine for Reducing Grain Products to Composite Forms of Food, granted February 16, 1909
- U.S. patent 913,671 – Reducing Disk Machine for the Manufacture of Cereal Products, granted February 23, 1909
- U.S. patent 916,365 – Machine for Manufacturing Grain into Form for Food, granted May 23, 1909
- U.S. patent 987,088 – Manufacture of Food from Cereals, granted March 14, 1911
- U.S. patent 987,089 – Variegated Corn Filament, granted March 14, 1911
- U.S. patent 989,999 – Machine for Manufacturing Grain into Form for Food, granted April 18, 1911
- U.S. patent 1,019,831 – Process of Manufacturing Grain into Form for Food, granted March 12, 1912
- U.S. patent 1,021,473 – Reducing Ground Grain to Elongated or Filament Form, granted March 26, 1912
- U.S. patent 1,022,501 – Machine for Manufacturing Grain into Form for Food, granted April 9, 1912
- U.S. patent 1,026,047 – Food from Grain and Method of Making the Same, granted May 14, 1912
- U.S. patent 1,060,702 – Form of Food from Grain and Method of Manufacturing the Same, granted May 6, 1913
- U.S. patent 1,064,164 – Process of Manufacturing Cereal Food, granted June 10, 1913
- U.S. patent 1,095,024 – Compound Forms, granted April 28, 1914
- U.S. patent 1,143,311 – Means for Reducing Cereal Products to Form, granted June 15, 1915
- U.S. patent 1,145,918 – Machine for Manufacturing Grain into Form for Food, granted July 13, 1915
- U.S. patent 1,147,263 – Machine for Manufacturing Grain into Form for Food, granted July 20, 1915
