= Shredded wheat =

Breakfast cereal made from whole wheat

Shredded Wheat
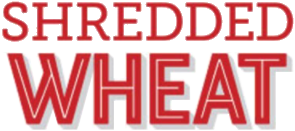

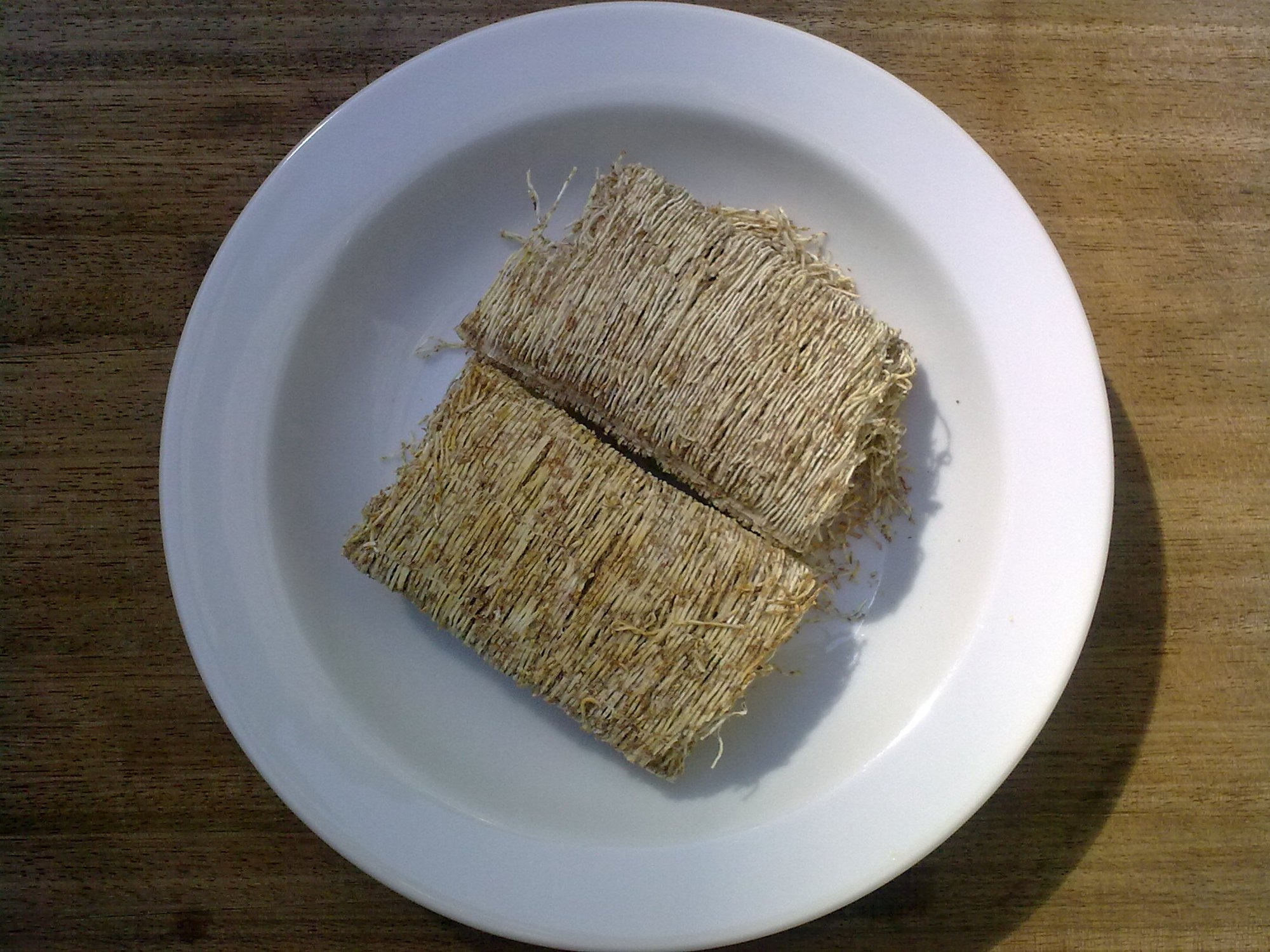
- Original size
- Product type: Breakfast cereal
- Current owner: Post Cereal; Kellogg's; Weetabix Limited; Cereal Partners Worldwide (UK)
- Produced by: Post Consumer (Worldwide); Nestlé (UK)
- Country: United States
- Introduced: 1893; 133 years ago
- Previous owners: Cereal Machine Company
- Website: postbrands.com/shreddedwheat

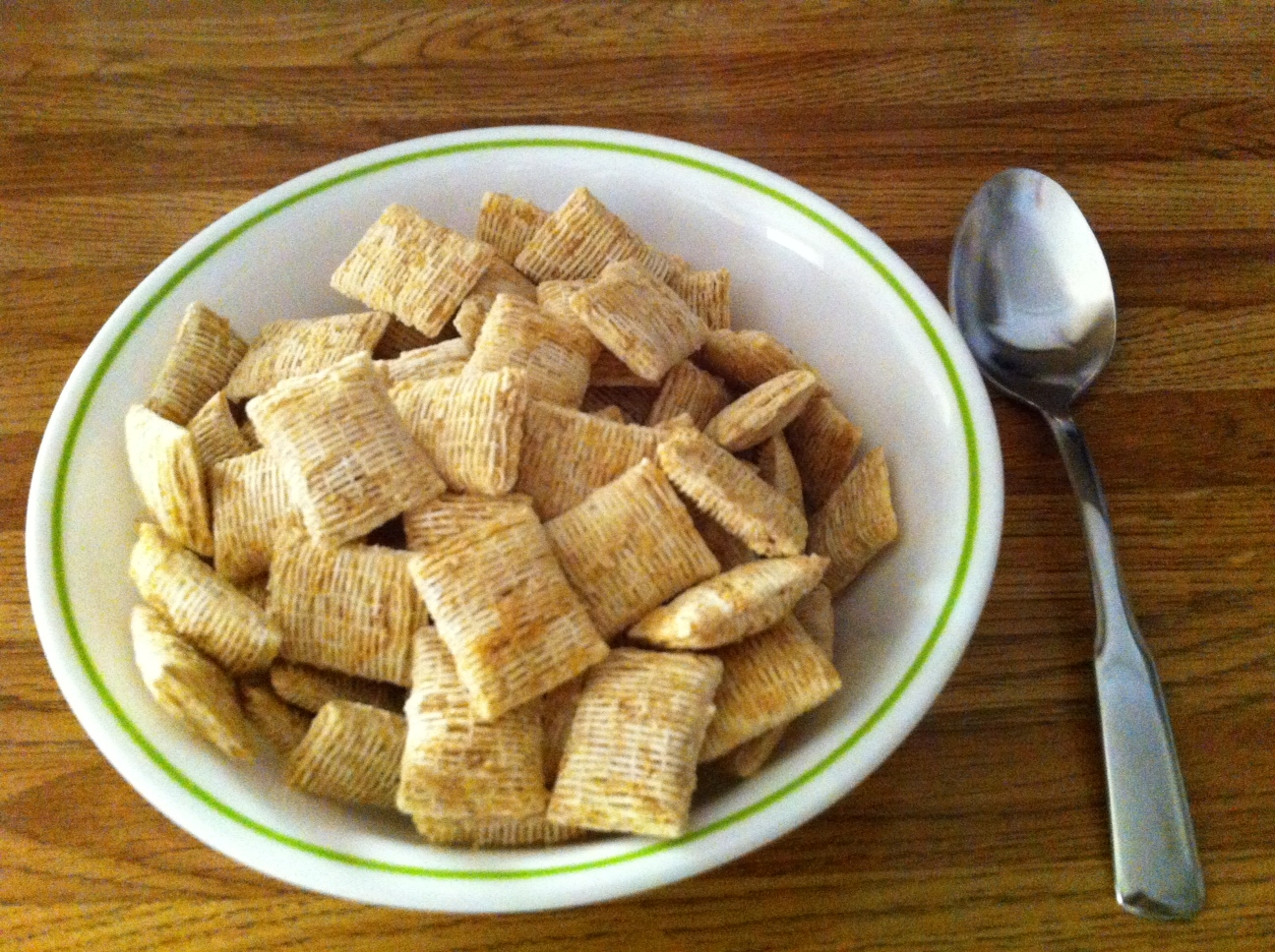
Bite-sized shredded wheat biscuits

Shredded wheat is a breakfast cereal made from whole wheat formed into pillow-shaped biscuits. It is commonly available in three sizes: original, bite-sized (¾×1 in) and miniature (nearly half the size of the bite-sized pieces). Both smaller sizes ("Mini-Wheats" and "little bites") are available in a frosted variety, which has one side coated with sugar and usually gelatin. Some manufacturers have produced "filled" versions of the bite-size cereal containing a raisin at the center, or apricot, blueberry, raspberry, cherry, cranberry or golden syrup filling.

In the United States, shredded wheat is most heavily advertised and marketed by Post Consumer Brands, which acquired the product in 1993 through its parent company, Kraft Foods, buying it from its long-time producer Nabisco. Kellogg's sells eight varieties of miniature, or bite-sized, shredded wheat cereal. Manufacturer Barbara's Bakery, a division of Weetabix Limited, also offers a version of plain shredded wheat. In the United Kingdom, the Shredded Wheat brand is owned by Cereal Partners, a Nestlé/General Mills company, although there are many generic versions and variants by different names. It was first made in the United States in 1893, while UK production began in 1926.

== History ==
=== United States and Canada ===
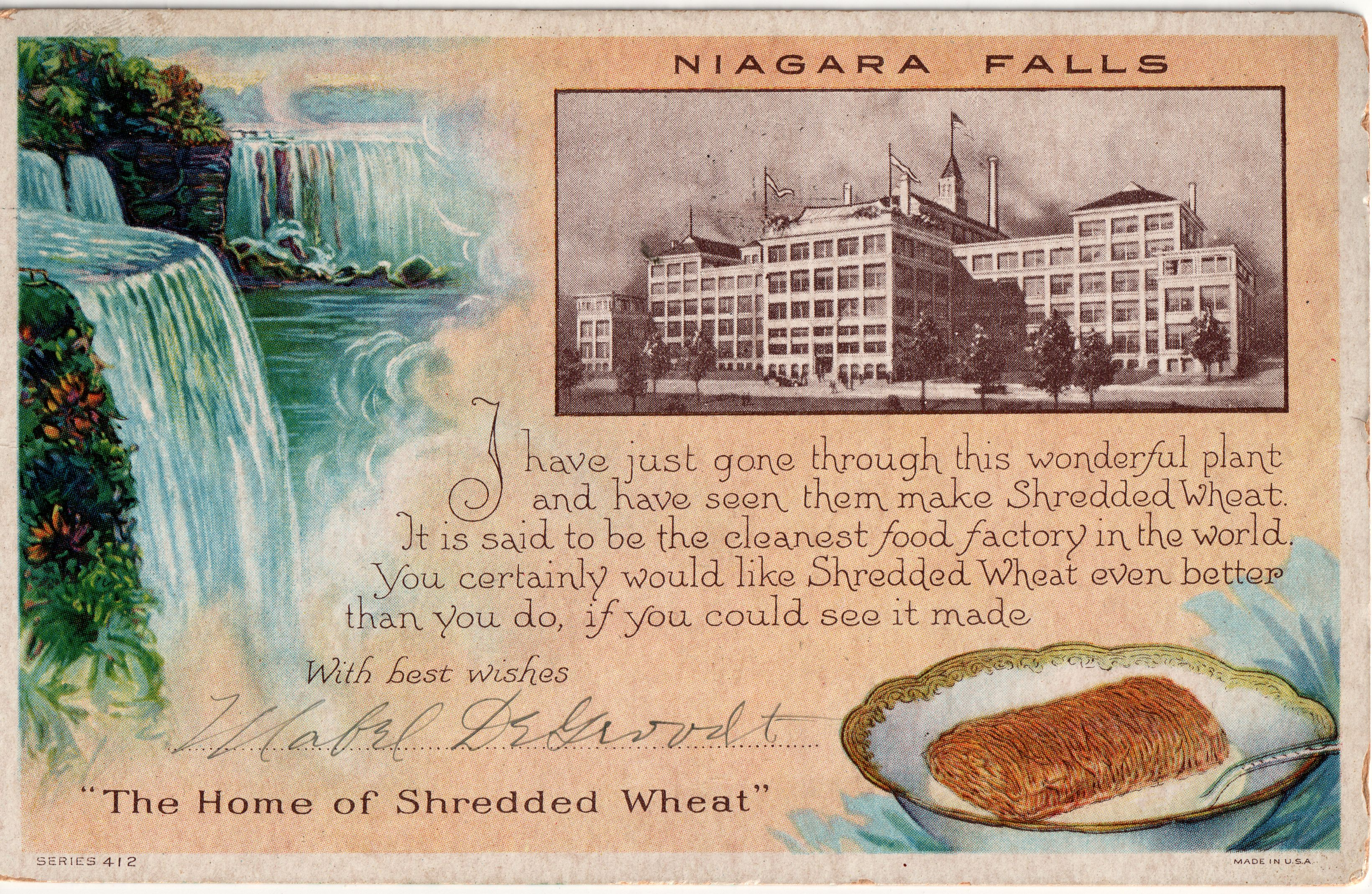
Shredded Wheat factory described as "said to be the cleanest food factory in the world" in an advertising card circa 1925

Henry Perky invented shredded wheat cereal in Denver, Colorado, in 1890, as well as founding the "Cereal Machine Company". In 1895, Perky received United States Patent Number 548,086, dated 15 October 1895. The biscuits proved more popular than the machines, so Perky moved east and opened his first bakery in Boston, Massachusetts, and then in Worcester, Massachusetts, in 1895, retaining the name of The Cereal Machine Company, and adding the name of the Shredded Wheat Company. Inspired by his observation of a dyspeptic diner blending wheat with cream, he developed a method of processing wheat into strips that were formed into pillow-like biscuits.

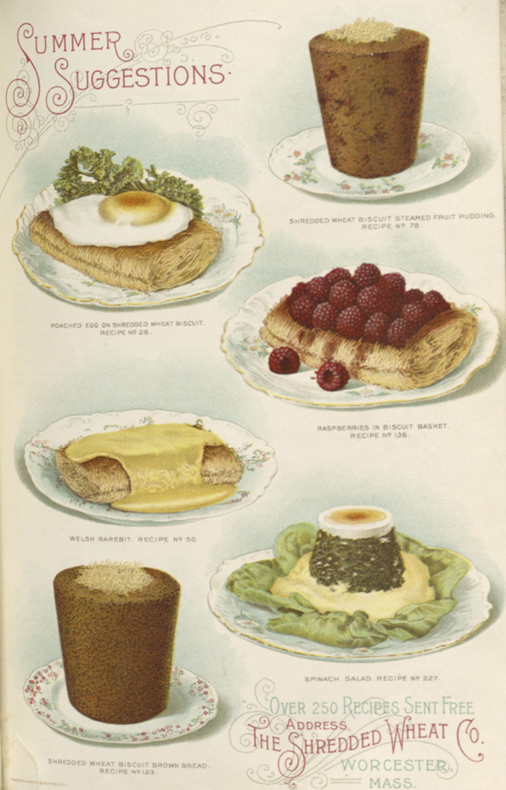
Shredded wheat recipes from 1899

Shredded Wheat newspaper ad from 1909. Produced in Niagara Falls, New York

The wheat is first cooked in water until its moisture content reaches about 50%. It is then tempered, allowing moisture to diffuse evenly into the grain. The grain then passes through a set of rollers with grooves in one side, yielding a web of shredded wheat strands. Many webs are stacked together, and this moist stack of strands is crimped at regular intervals to produce individual pieces of cereal with the strands attached at each end. These then go into an oven, where they are baked until their moisture content is reduced to 5%.

Perky first sold his shredded wheat cereal to vegetarian restaurants in 1892, distributing it from a factory in Niagara Falls, New York. A health-oriented publication, the Chicago Vegetarian, recommended the use of shredded wheat biscuits as soup croutons. At the same time, Perky leased cereal-manufacturing machines to bakers in Denver and Colorado Springs through his Cereal Machine Company and sold wheat processors.

One of his wheat-processor buyers, John Harvey Kellogg, admired Perky's manufacturing process. Kellogg declined to purchase Perky's patent on it, however, considering the product too weak in taste, "like eating a whisk broom." However, after co-founding the Battle Creek Toasted Corn Flake Company—later the Kellogg Company cereal manufacturer—with his brother Will Keith Kellogg in 1906, John Kellogg observed the success of Perky's product and offered to buy its patent from him, but at too low a price to pique Perky's interest.

Premiering to the public at Chicago's World Columbian Exposition in 1893, shredded wheat cereal was then manufactured by The Natural Food Company in Niagara Falls, New York, in 1901. It became the Shredded Wheat Company in 1904. It was bought by Nabisco (National Biscuit Company) in December 1928.

United States production of Shredded Wheat moved to Naperville, Illinois, in 1954, where it is still made. In 1993, Nabisco sold the brand to Kraft General Foods, but it was still under the Nabisco name until 1999, with the slogan "Nabisco brought to you by Post".

Canadian production has been at Niagara Falls, Ontario, since 1904 due to nearby hydro-electric power. Shredded Wheat was also produced in Niagara Falls, New York, first at Nabisco's factory on Buffalo Avenue beginning in 1901. In 1954, a new plant on Rainbow Boulevard opened less than a mile away and the Buffalo Avenue factory was sold. Despite being listed in the National Historic Register in 1974, the Buffalo Avenue plant was demolished in 1976. Production continued at the Rainbow Boulevard plant until it was closed in 2001 as production was consolidated on the Canadian side of the border.

In 1920, Henry Perky's son Scott Henry Perky developed a round shredded wheat cereal, which he named Muffets. The Muffets Corporation was sold to the Quaker Oats Company in 1927. The cereal is still marketed in Canada as Muffets, but in the U.S. is now sold as Quaker Shredded Wheat.

=== United Kingdom ===
==== History ====
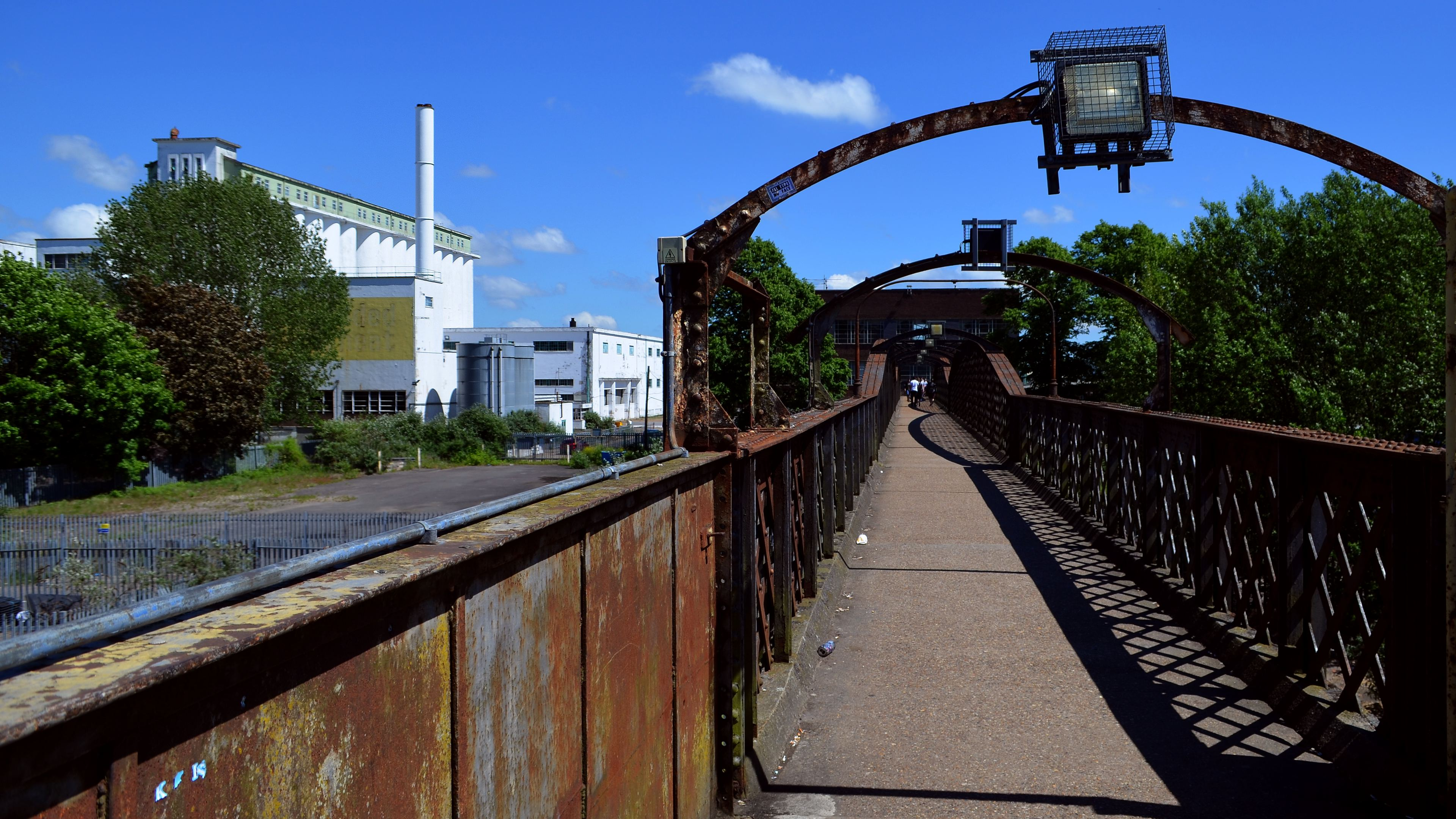
Former Shredded Wheat factory (left) in Welwyn Garden City, Hertfordshire, UK, in May 2017

The original company opened a factory in Welwyn Garden City, Hertfordshire, in 1926 at which time Welgar was its registered trade mark, which became part of Nabisco in 1928. The tall concrete cereal silos that formed part of the factory are a local landmark and are listed structures. The first 18 storage units were completed in 1926 with a further 27 constructed in 1938; in both instances they were built by Peter Lind & Company of London who continues in business today.

In 1988, Nabisco sold the UK site to Rank Hovis McDougall (who made own-label cereals for supermarkets), whose breakfast cereals division briefly became the Shredded Wheat Company. In 1990, RHM sold the site to Cereal Partners. Since 2007, all Shredded Wheat is made at Staverton, Wiltshire, and the Welwyn Garden City site was shut in 2008. The "Bitesize", "Fruitful" and "Honey Nut" Shredded Wheat variants are also made in the UK.

==== Advertising ====
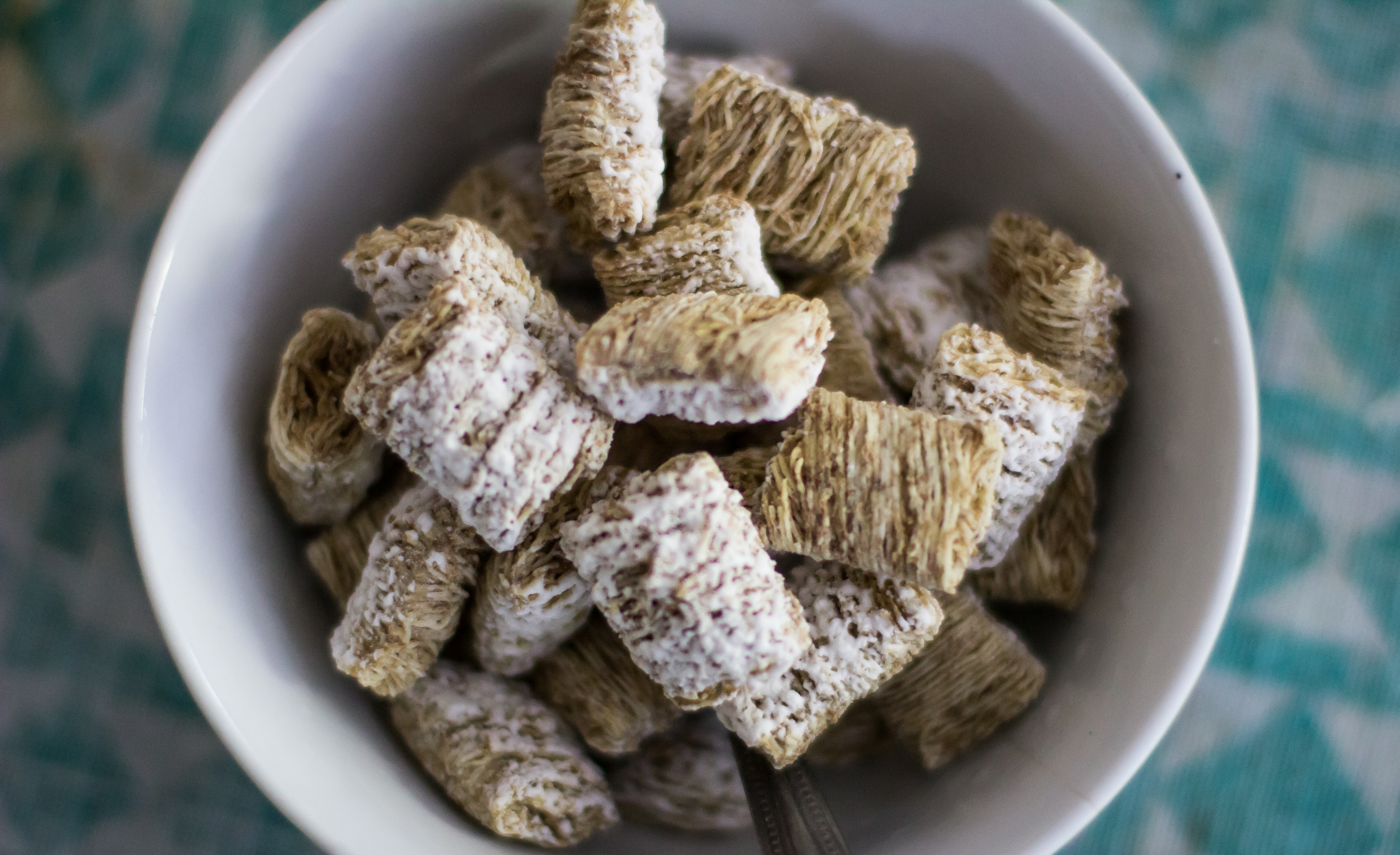
Frosted mini wheats

Shredded Wheat has a particular place in UK popular culture due to a long-running television advertising campaign. The campaign in the 1970s featured Linda Hoyle, singing the lyrics:

"There are two men in my life,
To one I am a mother,
To the other I'm a wife,
And I give them both the best
With natural Shredded Wheat"

The Three Shredded Wheat campaign, which came later, suggested that the cereal was so nourishing that it was impossible to eat three. Even a black hole was shown as exploding when the third biscuit was sucked into it. Phrases such as "I bet you can't eat three" and "He must have eaten three" were in common use as humorous remarks in the 1970s and 1980s, with celebrities such as Brian Clough, Peter Shilton, Richard Kiel and Ian Botham all 'unable' to eat three. A later UK poster advertisement for Carling Black Label showed a bowl with four Shredded Wheat and the caption "I bet he drinks Carling Black Label."

== Trademark of the term "Shredded Wheat" ==
After Henry Perky died in 1906 and the patent on his Shredded Wheat biscuit expired in 1912, John Harvey Kellogg saw that as an opportunity for Kellogg's to sell its own version of the product. Kellogg obtained a patent on the biscuit in 1915, and Kellogg's Shredded Wheat was born. This provoked National Biscuit Company to sue Kellogg for trademark infringement, attempting to enjoin him from using Shredded Wheat as a trade name and from manufacturing the cereal in its pillow-shaped form. This series of litigations led to the United States Supreme Court case Kellogg Co. v. National Biscuit Co. in 1938. The Supreme Court ruled that shredded wheat was generic and not trademarkable; and that in any case, when the first patent for shredded wheat machinery expired in 1912, the right to apply the name "shredded wheat" to the product passed into the public domain along with that patent.

== Serving and nutrition ==
Shredded wheat consists entirely of whole wheat. Two biscuits (47 g) contain 160 calories, 1 g of fat and 6 g of dietary fiber (12.8% by weight).

== See also ==
- Frosted Mini-Wheats, a brand of frosted shredded wheat
- Raisin Wheats, a brand of filled shredded wheat
- Shreddies, a wheat-based cereal sold in Canada, the UK and Ireland
- Weetabix, another wheat-based biscuit cereal
- Weet-Bix, a wheat-based biscuit cereal in Australia and New Zealand
- Triscuit, a savory cracker produced with a similar process
