= Cookie Crisp =

Breakfast cereal made by General Mills

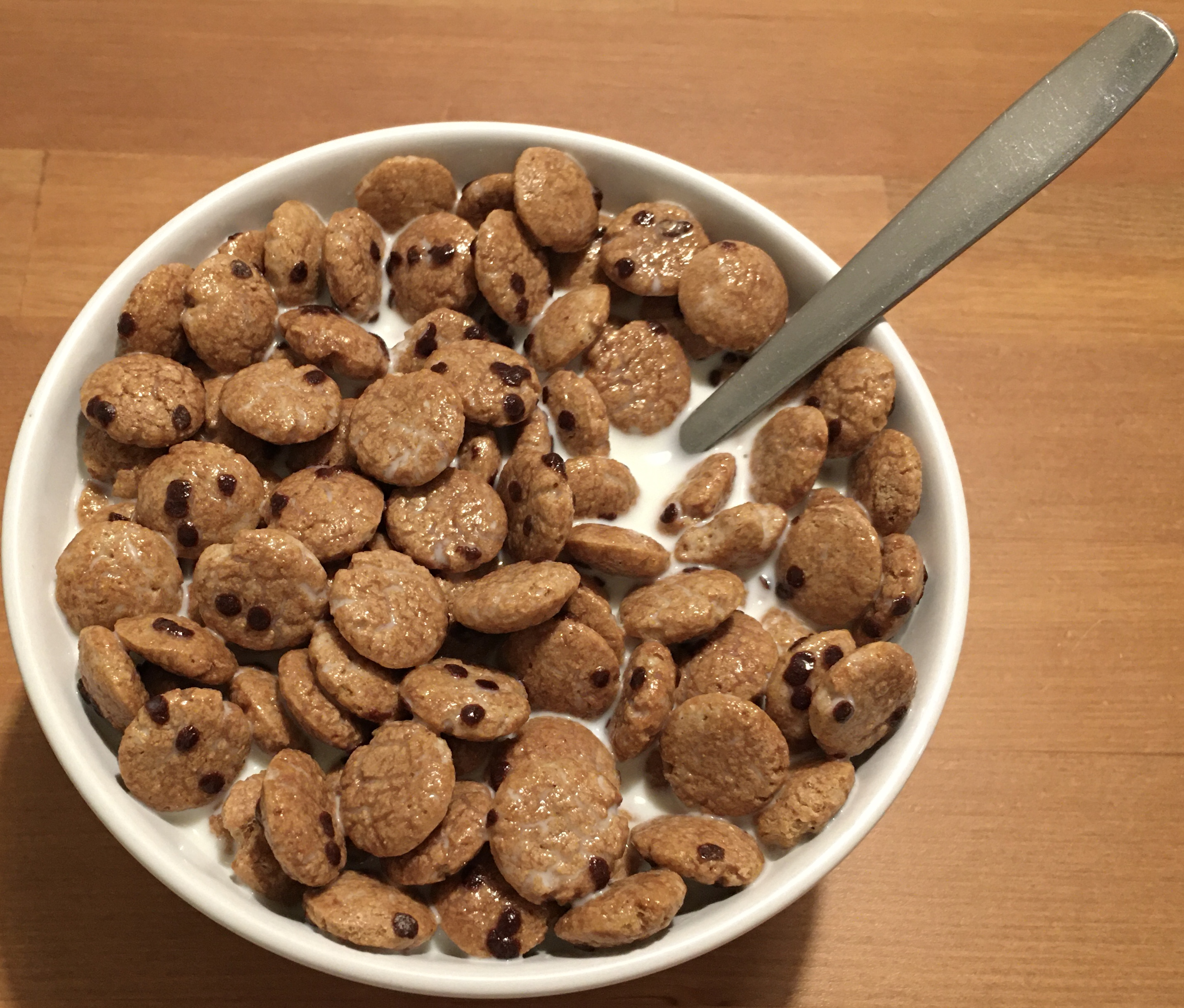
- Cookie Crisp – Naturally Flavored Sweetened Cereal with milk
- Product type: Breakfast cereal
- Current owner: General Mills (1997–present)
- Produced by: General Mills (US); Nestlé (outside US)
- Introduced: 1977; 49 years ago
- Markets: Worldwide
- Previous owners: Ralston Purina (1977–97)

Cookie Crisp is a breakfast cereal that is manufactured to look like chocolate chip cookies. It is produced by General Mills in the United States and Cereal Partners under the Nestlé brand in other countries. Introduced in 1977, it was originally produced by Ralston Purina until they sold the trademark to General Mills in 1997.

== Varieties ==
Nestle Cookie Crisp logo

From 1977 until 1997 under Ralston's ownership, Cookie Crisp was available in three varieties: Chocolate Chip Cookie Crisp, Vanilla Wafer Cookie Crisp and Oatmeal Cookie Crisp.

Peanut Butter Cookie Crisp was introduced in 2005 but was phased out by 2007.

Double Chocolate Cookie Crisp was introduced in 2007.

Sprinkles Cookie Crisp was introduced in July 2009. This variety contains crisps shaped like tiny vanilla cookies topped with tiny multicolored sprinkles.

Birthday Cake Cookie Crisp was introduced in March 2018.

== Imitations ==
Keebler Cookie Crunch was introduced by Kellogg's in 2008. This cereal has standard cookie pieces as well as round O shapes meant to resemble Keebler Fudge Shoppe Fudge Stripes cookies.

== Advertising ==
A box of Cookie Crisp from 1984, featuring Cookie Jarvis

The first Cookie Crisp mascot, Cookie Jarvis, was introduced in 1977. A wizard in the Merlin mold, he magically turns cookie jars into cereal bowls with a wave of his wand and rhyming incantations. He was voiced by Lennie Weinrib. In 1980, Cookie Jarvis was joined by Cookie Crook, a robber who attempts to steal the Cookie Crisp. In 1984 the Crook was followed by his opponent, the Cookie Cop (full name Officer Crumb), a Keystone Cops-esque police officer with an Irish accent who thwarts the Cookie Crook's attempts to steal the Cookie Crisp.

From left: the Cookie Crook, the Cookie Cop, and Chip the Dog

In 1990, the Cookie Crook was given a sidekick named Chip the Dog. Chip would serve as a partial foil to the Crook, often by howling "Cooookie Crisp!" and exposing them to the Cookie Cop. After General Mills bought the Cookie Crisp trademark from Ralston in 1997, Chip became the cereal's sole mascot. He would take on a more heroic role, no longer wearing a mask, and offered Cookie Crisp to kids. Typically an adult would interfere saying that cookies are not breakfast food, but Chip would change their minds by giving them a taste of the cereal.

In 2003, Cookie Crisp was introduced in Europe and Asia. The mascot in these countries was Chip the Wolf (originally known as The Howler), a wolf who possessed Chip the Dog's earlier thieving characteristics, fruitlessly attempting to steal Cookie Crisp from children with his various gadgets. In 2005, Chip the Wolf replaced Chip the Dog as the cereal's mascot in the United States. He is voiced by Marc Silk in the UK and Robb Pruitt in the U.S.

== See also ==
- List of breakfast cereals
