= Fitness (cereal) =

Cereal food brand owned by Nestlé

- Product type: Breakfast cereal
- Current owner: Nestlé
- Website: nestle.com/fitness

Fitness, also known as Fitnesse, is a brand of breakfast cereals and granola bars produced by Nestlé.

In Brazil, the brand is called Nesfit and also includes cookies and drinks.

In July 2015, Nestlé updated its recipe by reducing its sugar content by up to 30% without any artificial sweeteners.
