= Kellanova =

American multinational food company

- Type: Subsidiary
- Traded as: NYSE: K
- Industry: Food processing
- Predecessor: Kellogg's
- Founded: October 2, 2023; 3 years ago
- Headquarters: Chicago, Illinois, United States
- Area served: Worldwide
- Products: Cereals (outside North America); Cereal bars; Fruit-flavored snacks; Crackers; Frozen waffles; Kellogg's; Toaster pastries; Vegetarian foods
- Brands: Eggo; Gardenburger; Pringles; Rxbar; Pop-Tarts; Rice Krispies Treats; Cheez-It
- Revenue: ▼US$12.7 billion (2024)
- Operating income: ▲US$1.87 billion (2024)
- Net income: ▲US$1.34 billion (2024)
- Total assets: ▲US$15.6 billion (2024)
- Total equity: ▲US$3.78 billion (2024)
- Number of employees: c. 24,000 (2024)
- Parent: Mars Snacking
- Website: kellanova.com

Kellogg's brand logo used by both Kellanova and WK Kellogg Co, formerly used as a corporate logo until 2023, still used today as a brand.

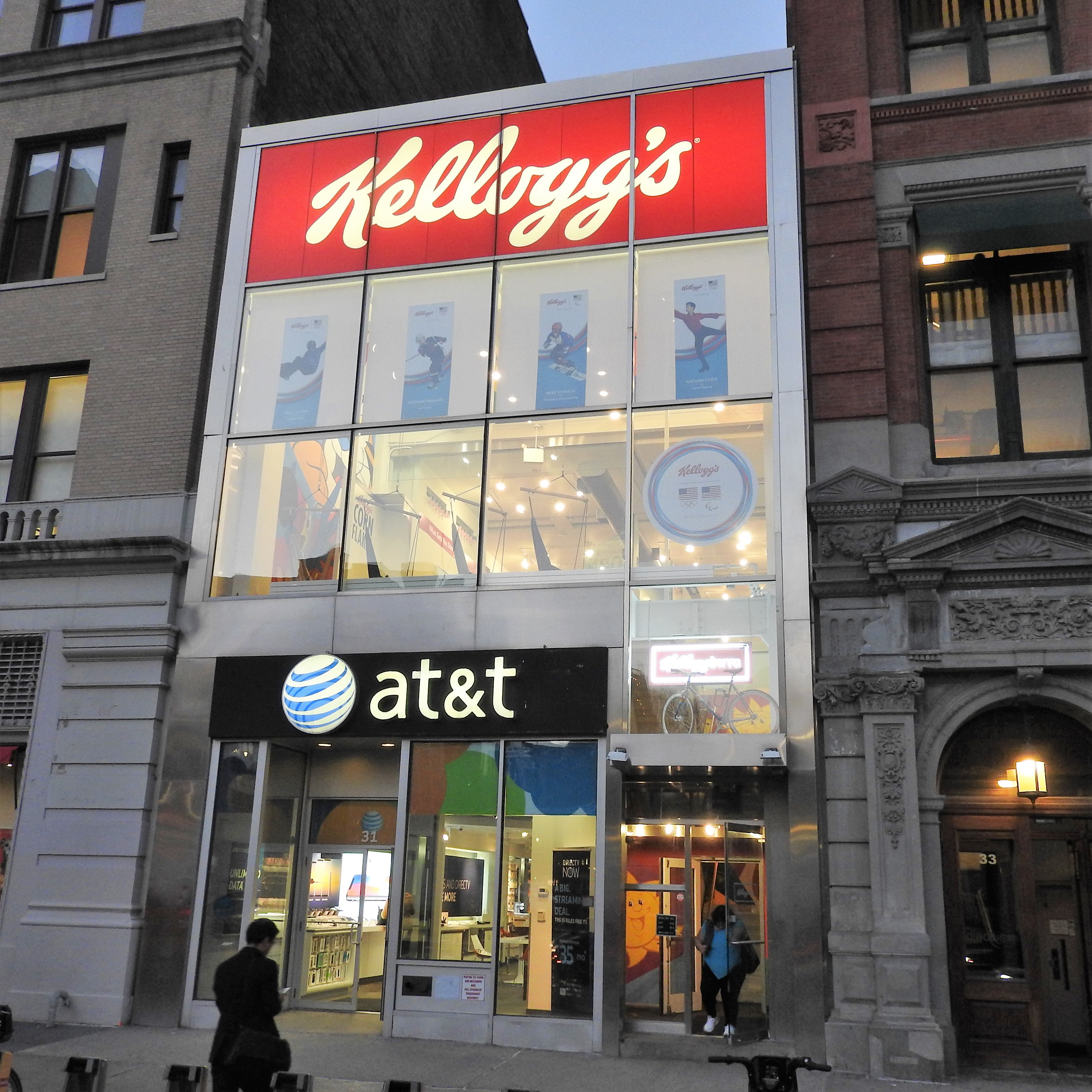
Former Kellogg's Café and AT&T store below, Union Square (Manhattan)

Kellanova, formerly known as the Kellogg Company, is an American multinational corporation owned by Mars Inc., headquartered in Chicago, Illinois, and known for food manufacturing.

The company became known as Kellanova on October 2, 2023, with the company's North American cereal operations spun off to form the WK Kellogg Co at the same time. The name combines "Kell" (from the Kellogg Company) with the Latin word nova, meaning "new".

Kellanova produces and markets convenience foods and snack foods, including crackers, toaster pastries, and breakfast cereal. They market their products by several well-known brands including Kellogg's, Rice Krispies Treats, Pringles, Eggo, and Cheez-It. Outside of North America, Kellanova markets cereals such as corn flakes, Rice Krispies, Frosties, and Coco Pops.

Kellanova's products are manufactured and marketed in over 180 countries. Kellanova's largest factory is at Trafford Park in Greater Manchester, United Kingdom, which is also the location of its UK headquarters. Other corporate office locations outside of Chicago include Battle Creek, Michigan; Dublin, Ireland (European Headquarters); Shanghai, China; and Santiago de Querétaro, Mexico. As Kellogg's, the company held a Royal Warrant from Queen Elizabeth II until her death in 2022.

Kellogg's was restructured into two companies on October 2, 2023; WK Kellogg Co would manage the North American breakfast cereal division, while the previously existing company rebranded to "Kellanova", managing snack brands such as Pop-Tarts and Pringles alongside the international cereal division. The purpose of the split was to separate the convenience food, and international cereal products market, from the North American cereal market. "Kellogg's" itself became a brand name of both companies.

Mars Inc., the owner of M&M's, Snickers, Doublemint, Life Savers, Starburst candy, and Sugus, entered into an agreement to acquire Kellanova for nearly $30 billion in August, 2024; The acquisition was completed on December 11, 2025.

== History ==
On June 21, 2022, Kellogg's announced a plan to spin off its three cereal, snacks, and plant-based food divisions into separate companies. The North American cereal and plant-based food spin-off companies were to keep Battle Creek as their headquarters and the new snack and international cereal company would be based in Chicago. The successor company, known as Global Snacking Co. temporarily, represented 80 percent or $11.4 billion of Kellogg's sales. Sixty percent of Global Snacking's business was snacks, and nearly half of the company's business was in the United States. The cereal business, temporarily called North America Cereal Co., was to be the second-largest American cereal company and the largest in Canada and the Caribbean, with 5 of the top 11 brands and $2.4 billion in annual sales. Plant-based foods, representing $340 million in annual sales, were to be called "Plant Co." and could potentially be sold.

In January 2023, Kellogg's shelved its plans to spin off its plant food business and retained it as part of Global Snacking Co. On March 15, 2023, Kellogg's announced that the North America Cereal Co. branch would be named WK Kellogg Co and the Global Snacking Co. branch would be called Kellanova. The split was structured with Kellanova as the surviving company, using the ticker symbol "K" on the NYSE. The WK Kellogg Co took the NYSE stock symbol "KLG". The split was completed on October 2, 2023.

On August 14, 2024, Mars Inc. agreed to purchase Kellanova for nearly $30 billion. The purchase, originally planned to close in the first half of 2025, was approved by the Federal Trade Commission (FTC) in the US but it was delayed to December 11, 2025, due to the European Commission not approving the deal until December 8, 2025.

The acquisition was completed on 11 December 2025, with Kellanova being integrated into Mars. Kellanova CEO Steve Cahillane stepped down from the company following the acquisition and the company was delisted from the New York Stock Exchange.

== Operations ==
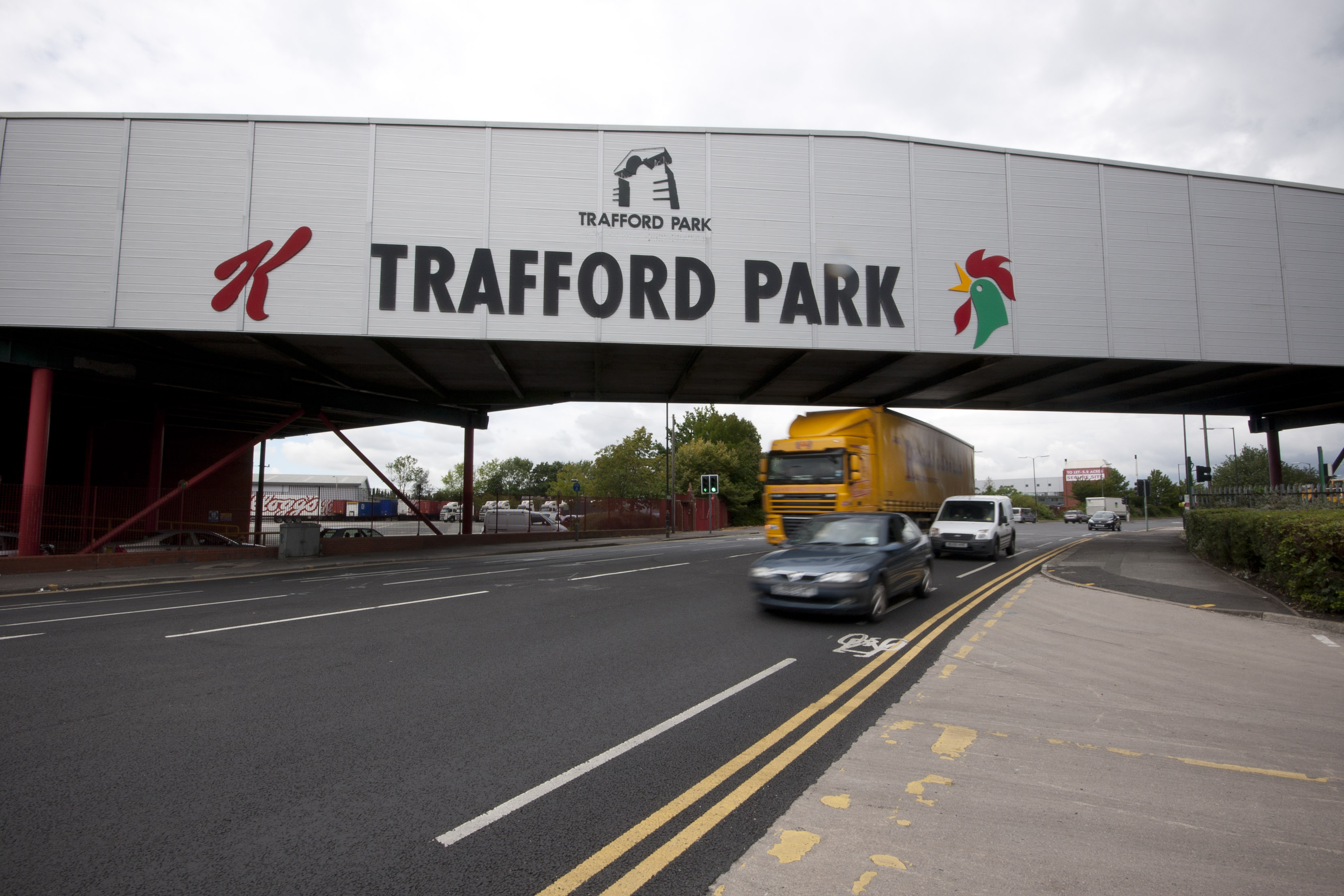
The Trafford Park factory in Greater Manchester, England—Kellogg's European base since 1938. The factory produces more Corn Flakes than any other Kellogg's factory in the world.

- Australia:
  - Pagewood
  - Charmhaven (snack and cereal plant closed in 2014.)
- Belgium: Zaventem & Mechelen plant
- Brazil: São Paulo
- Colombia: Bogotá
- Canada:
  - Mississauga, Ontario – Canadian head office
  - Anjou, Quebec – Eastern Canada sales office
  - Calgary, Alberta – Western Canada sales office
  - London, Ontario – manufacturers and distributes cereals (including corn flakes) in Canada. Closed at end of 2014,
  - Belleville, Ontario – cereal production plant opened 2009 and upgraded 2011; took over some operations from London after 2014
- China: Shanghai – Joint venture with agribusiness and food company Yihai Kerry
- Ecuador: Guayaquil
- France: Noisy-le-Grand, Paris
- Germany: Hamburg (sales and marketing for Germany, Austria, Switzerland, and Scandinavia; production in Germany shut down in 2018)
- India: Mumbai
- Republic of Ireland: European Head Office – Kellogg Europe Trading, Swords, County Dublin
- Italy: Milan
- Japan: Shinjuku, Tokyo
- Malaysia: Bandar Enstek, Negeri Sembilan
- Mexico: Querétaro
- Middle East
  - Bahrain: Manama
  - Egypt: Giza
  - Iran: Tehran
  - Israel: Lod
  - Jordan: Amman
  - Kuwait: Kuwait City
  - Lebanon: Beirut
  - Libya: Tripoli
  - Oman: Azaiba, Muscat
  - Qatar: Doha
  - Saudi Arabia: Jeddah
  - Syria: Damascus
  - UAE: Dubai
- Netherlands: Den Bosch
- Philippines: Bonifacio Global City
- Poland: Kutno
- Portugal: Lisbon
- Russia: Kellogg Rus LLC (Sold to the Russian company Chernogolovka in July 2023)
- South Africa: Springs
- South Korea: Seoul
- Spain: Valls (cereal production plant) and Alcobendas (Spanish head office)
- Sri Lanka: Colombo; Sri Jayawardenapura Kotte
- Thailand: Bangkok, Rayong (snacks and cereals)
- United Kingdom:
  - England: Manchester
  - Scotland: Portable Foods Manufacturing Livingston
  - Wales: Wrexham including Portable Foods Manufacturing
- United States:
  - Battle Creek, Michigan
  - Cary, North Carolina
  - Jackson, Tennessee
  - Lancaster, Pennsylvania
  - Memphis, Tennessee
  - Omaha, Nebraska
  - Pikeville, Kentucky
  - South Augusta, Georgia
  - Virginia Beach, Virginia

== Brands ==
- Austin Sandwich Cookies
- Bear Naked, Inc.
- Carr's (US only)
- Cheez-It Crackers
- Club Crackers
- Cracklin' Oat Bran
- Eggo
- Frozen Breakfast
- Fruit Winders
- Fruity Snacks
- Gardenburger
- Incogmeato
- Joybol
- Morningstar Farms
- Mueslix Cereal
- Nutri-Grain
- Pop-Tarts
- Pringles
- Pure Organic Fruit Bars
- Rice Krispies Treats
- Rxbar
- Special K (snack bars)
- Sunshine Biscuits
- Toasteds Crackers
- Town House
- Zesta Crackers

=== Cereal ===
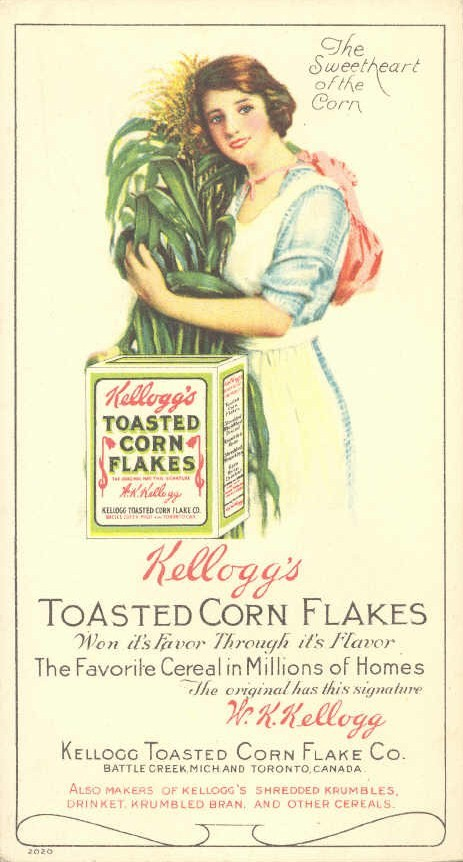
Advertisement, 1910s

Below is a list of Kellanova's cereals (international only) with available varieties:

- All-Bran: All-Bran Original, All-Bran Bran Buds, All-Bran Bran Flakes (UK), All-Bran Extra Fiber, All-Bran Guardian (Canada)
- Apple Jacks
- Apple Jacks Apple vs Cinnamon Limited Edition
- Apple Jacks 72 Flavor Blast (Germany)
- Bran Buds (New Zealand)
- Bran Flakes
- Chocos (India, Europe)
- Chocolate Corn Flakes: a chocolate version of Corn Flakes. First sold in the UK in 1998 (as Choco Corn Flakes or Choco Flakes), but discontinued a few years later. Re-released in 2011.
- Cinnabon
- Cinnamon Mini Buns
- Coco Pops Coco Rocks
- Coco Pops Special Edition Challenger Spaceship
- Coco Pops Crunchers
- Coco Pops Mega Munchers
- Coco Pops Moons and Stars
- Cocoa Krispies or Coco Pops (also called Choco Pops in France, Choco Krispies in Portugal, Spain, Germany, Austria, and Switzerland, Choco Krispis in Latin America)
- Cocoa Flakes
- Corn Flakes
- Complete Wheat Bran Flakes/Bran Flakes
- Corn Pops
- Country Store
- Cracklin' Oat Bran
- Crayola Jazzberry Cereal: In 2021, Kellogg and Crayola teamed up to create a fruit flavored cereal with a coloring book on the box.
- Crispix
- Crunch: Caramel Nut Crunch, Cran-Vanilla Crunch, Toasted Honey Crunch
- Crunchy Nut (formerly Crunchy Nut Cornflakes)
- Crunch Nut Bran
- Cruncheroos
- Disney cereals: Disney Hunny B's Honey-Graham, Disney Mickey's Magix, Disney Mud & Bugs, Pirates of the Caribbean, Disney Princess
- Donut Shop
- Eggo
- Extra (Muesli): Fruit and Nut, Fruit Magic, Nut Delight
- Froot Loops: Froot Loops, Froot Loops 1/3 Less Sugar, Marshmallow Froot Loops, Froot Bloopers
- Frosted Flakes (Frosties outside of the US/Canada): Kellogg's Frosted Flakes, Kellogg's Frosted Flakes 1/3Kellogg's Banana Frosted Flakes, Kellogg's Birthday Confetti Frosted Flakes, Kellogg's Cocoa Frosted Flakes, Less Sugar, Tony's Cinnamon Krunchers, Honey Nut
- Frosted Mini-Wheats (known in the UK as Toppas until the early 1990s, when the name was changed to Frosted Wheats. The name Toppas is still applied to this product in other parts of Europe, as in Germany and Austria)
- Fruit Harvest: Fruit Harvest Apple Cinnamon, Fruit Harvest Peach Strawberry, Fruit Harvest Strawberry Blueberry
- Fruit 'n Fibre (not related to the Post cereal of the same name sold in the US)
- Fruit Winders (UK)
- Genmai Flakes (Japan)
- Guardian (Australia, NZ, Canada)
- Happy Inside: Bold Blueberry, Simply Strawberry, Coconut Crunch
- Honey Loops (formerly Honey Nut Loops)
- Honey Nut Corn Flakes
- Honey Smacks (US)/Smacks (other markets)
- Jif Peanut Butter Cereal (US only)
- Just Right: Just Right Original, Just Right Fruit & Nut, Just Right Just Grains, Just Right Tropical, Just Right Berry & Apple, Just Right Crunchy Blends – Cranberry, Almond & Sultana (Australia/NZ), Just Right Crunchy Blends – Apple, Date & Sultana (Australia/NZ)
- Khampa Tsampa- Roasted Barley (Tibet)
- Kombos
- Krave – chocolate cereal introduced in the UK in 2010, then rolled out in Europe as Tresor or Trésor in 2011, and in North America in 2012
- Komplete (Australia)
- Low-Fat Granola: Low-Fat Granola, Low-Fat Granola with Raisins
- Mini Max
- Mini Swirlz
- Mini-Wheats: Mini-Wheats Frosted Original, Mini-Wheats Frosted Bite Size, Mini-Wheats Frosted Maple & Brown Sugar, Mini-Wheats Raisin, Mini-Wheats Strawberry, Mini-Wheats Vanilla Creme, Mini-Wheats Strawberry Delight, Mini-Wheats Blackcurrant
- Mueslix: Mueslix with Raisins, Dates & Almonds
- Nutri-Grain
- Nut Feast
- Oat Bran: Cracklin' Oat Bran
- Optivita
- Pop-Tarts Bites: Frosted Strawberry, Frosted Brown Sugar Cinnamon
- Raisin Bran/Sultana Bran: Raisin Bran, Raisin Bran Crunch, Sultana Bran (Australia/NZ), Sultana Bran Crunch (Australia/NZ)
- Raisin Wheats
- Rice Krispies/Rice Bubbles: Rice Krispies, Frosted Rice Krispies (Ricicles in the UK), Gluten Free Rice Krispies, Rice Bubbles, LCMs, Rice Krispies Cocoa (Canada only), Rice Crispies Multi-Grain Shapes, Rice Krispies Treats Cereal
- Rocky Mountain Chocolate Factory Chocolatey Almond cereal
- Scooby-Doo cereal: Cinnamon Marshmallow Scooby-Doo! Cereal
- Smart Start: Smart Start, Smart Start Soy Protein Cereal
- Smorz
- Special K: Special K, Special K low carb lifestyle, Special K Red Berries, Special K Vanilla Almond, Special K Honey & Almond (Australia), Special K Forest Berries (Australia), Special K Purple Berries (UK), Special K Light Muesli Mixed Berries & Apple (Australia/NZ), Special K Light Muesli Peach & Mango flavour (Australia/NZ), Special K Dark Chocolate (Belgium), Special K Milk Chocolate (Belgium), Special K Sustain (UK)
- Spider-Man cereal: Spider-Man Spidey-Berry
- SpongeBob SquarePants cereal
- Strawberry Pops (South Africa)
- Super Mario Cereal
- Sustain: Sustain, Sustain Selection
- Tresor (Europe)
- Variety
- Vector (Canada only)
- Yeast bites with honey
- Kringelz (formerly known as ZimZ!): mini cinnamon-flavored spirals. Only sold in Germany and Austria

=== Discontinued cereals and foods ===
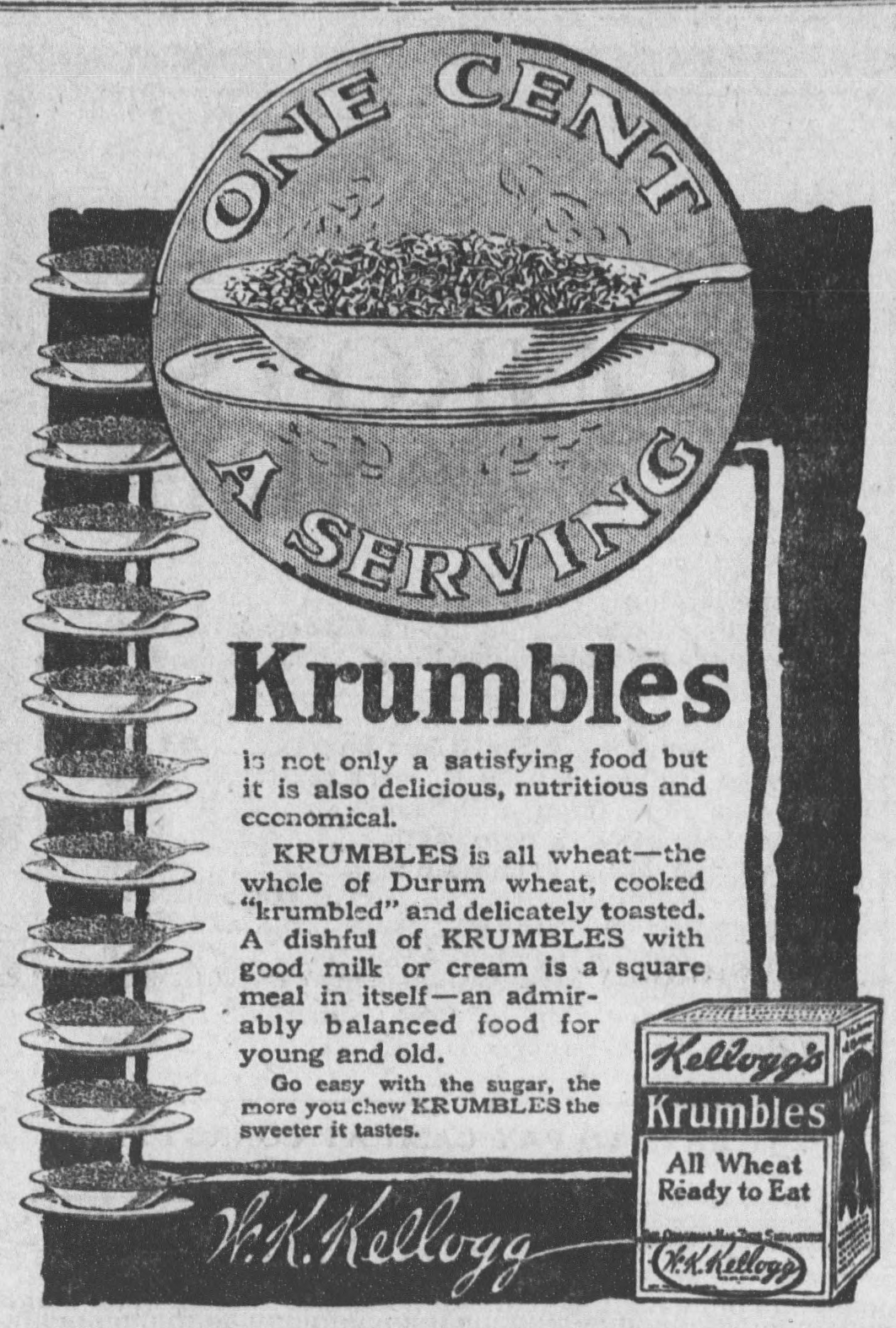
1917 advertisement for Krumbles

- Banana Bubbles

Banana-flavored variation of Rice Krispies. First appeared in the UK in 1995, but discontinued shortly thereafter.

- Banana Frosted Flakes
- Bart Simpson's No Problem-O's and Bart Simpson's Eat My Shorts

Sold in the UK for a limited period

- Bart Simpson Peanut Butter Chocolate Crunch Cereal
- Bigg Mixx cereal
- Buckwheat & Maple
- Buzz Blasts (based on Buzz Lightyear from the Toy Story movies)
- C-3PO's cereal: Introduced in 1984 and inspired by the multi-lingual droid from Star Wars, the cereal called itself "a New (crunchy) Force at Breakfast" and was composed of "twin rings phased together for two crunches in every double-O". In other words, they were shaped like the digit 8. After severing the cereal's ties to Star Wars, the company renamed it Pro-Grain and promoted it with sports-oriented commercials.
- Cinnamon Crunch Crispix
- Cinnamon Mini-Buns
- Cocoa Hoots: Manufactured briefly in the early 1970s, this cereal resembled Cheerios but was chocolate-flavored. The mascot was a cartoon character named Newton the Owl, and one of its commercials featured a young Jodie Foster.
- Coco Pops Strawss
- Complete Oat Bran Flakes
- Concentrate
- Corn Flakes with Instant Bananas
- Corn Soya cereal
- Crunchy Loggs
- Double Dip Crunch
- Eggo Waf-Fulls
- Frosted Krispies
- Frosted Rice: This was a combination of Frosted Flakes and Rice Krispies, using Rice Krispies with frosting on them. Tony Jr. was the brand's mascot.
- Fruit Twistables
- Fruity Marshmallow Krispies
- Golden Crackles
- Golden Oatmeal Crunch (later revised to Golden Crunch)
- Gro-Pup Dog Food and Dog Biscuits
- Heartwise (which contained psyllium, an Indian-grown grain used as a laxative and cholesterol-reducer)
- Homer's Cinnamon Donut Cereal (based on The Simpsons TV cartoon)
- Kenmei Rice Bran cereal
- KOMBOs (orange, strawberry and chocolate flavors)
- Kream Krunch
- Krumbles cereal: Manufactured from approximately the 1920s to the mid-1960s; based on shreds of wheat but different from shredded wheat in texture. Unlike the latter, it tended to remain crisp in milk. In the Chicago area, Krumbles was available into the late 1960s. It was also high in fiber, although that attribute was not in vogue at the time.
- Marshmallow Krispies (later revised to Fruity Marshmallow Krispies)
- Most
- Mr. T's Muscle Crunch (1983–1985)
- Nut & Honey Crunch
- OJ's ("All the Vitamin C of a 4-oz. Glass of Orange Juice")
- OKs cereal (early 1960s): Oat-based cereal physically resembling the competing brand Cheerios, with half the OKs shaped like letter O's and the other half shaped like K's, but did not taste like Cheerios. OKs originally featured Big Otis, a giant, burly Scotsman, on the box; this was replaced by the more familiar Yogi Bear.
- Pep: Best remembered as the sponsor of the Superman radio serial.
- Pokémon Cereal: A limited edition cereal that promoted the Pokémon franchise. It consisted of O-shaped cereal and marshmallows shaped liked Pikachu, Oddish, Poliwhirl and Ditto. They later returned during Gen II with marshmallows formed like Cleffa, Wobbuffet and Pichu for a short time.
- Pop-Tarts Crunch
- Powerpuff Girls Cereal
- Product 19: Discontinued in 2016
- Pro Grain
- Puffa Puffa Rice (late 1960s–early 1970s)
- Raisin Squares
- Raisins Rice and Rye
- Razzle Dazzle Rice Krispies
- Ricicles
- Sugar Stars/Stars/All-Stars cereal
- Strawberry Rice Krispies
- Strawberry Splitz
- 3 Point Pops
- Tony's Cinnamon Krunchers
- Tony's Turboz
- Triple Snack
- Yogos: Discontinued in 2011
- Yogos (Berry, Mango, Strawberry, 72 Flavor Blast (Germany), Cookies and Cream, Tacos (Mexico))
- Yogos Rollers: Discontinued in 2009
- Zimz: Cinnamon Cereal Discontinued
- Start (UK)

=== Mascots ===
Licensed brands have been omitted because their mascots are simply the licensed characters themselves (for example, Spider-Man is the mascot of Spider-Man Spidey-Berry).

- Cocoa Hoots cereal: Newton the Owl
- Cocoa Krispies cereal (Known as Choco Krispis in Latin America, Choco Krispies in Germany, Austria, Spain, and Switzerland, Chocos in India, and Coco Pops in Australia, the UK, and Europe): Jose (monkey), Coco (monkey), Melvin (elephant), Snagglepuss (Hanna-Barbera character), Ogg (caveman), Tusk (elephant), and Snap, Crackle and Pop (who were also, and remain as of February 2014, the Rice Krispies mascots; see below)
- Corn flakes cereal: Cornelius (rooster)
- Frosted Flakes (known as Frosties outside the US/Canada, Zucaritas in Latin America and Sucrilhos in Brazil) cereal: Tony the Tiger
- Froot Loops cereal: Toucan Sam
- Honey Smacks (US)/Smacks (other markets) cereal: Dig 'Em Frog
- Raisin Bran cereal: Sunny the Sun
- Rice Krispies (known as Rice Bubbles in Australia and New Zealand) cereal: Snap, Crackle and Pop
- Ricicles (UK Only) cereal: Captain Rik
- Apple Jacks cereal: CinnaMon and Bad Apple
- Honey Loops cereal: Loopy (bumblebee), Pops (honey bee)
- Keebler cookies and crackers: Ernie and the Elves

== See also ==
- W. K. Kellogg Foundation
- Kellogg's Cereal City USA – a former tourist attraction in Battle Creek, Michigan focused on the company's history
- List of breakfast cereals
- Toucan Sam#Maya Archaeology Initiative for a 2011 trademark dispute over another organization's toucan logo
- A. D. David Mackay
