= Watson H. Vanderploeg =

General manager and president of the Kellogg's (1888–1957)

Watson H. Vanderploeg (1888–1957) was an American executive who served as the general manager and president of the Kellogg's from 1939 to 1957.

== Early life and education ==
Born in Iowa, Vanderploeg's early life involved farming, which later helped his work at Kellogg, where he was responsible for the production and distribution of corn-based breakfast cereals. He completed his education from the Central University Academy in Pella, Iowa. Later, he was also admitted to the Iowa Bar, though he never practiced law.

== Career ==
Vanderploeg began his career in banking after graduation, becoming a messenger at a Pella bank. He eventually acquired the bank, merged it with another, and managed the combined entity for six years before selling it.

In 1924, the Iowa Banking Commission appointed him to handle the liquidation of five closed banks in Des Moines, a complex task that took six years to complete. Following this, he moved to Chicago, where he became a vice president at the Harris Trust and Savings Bank.

In 1937, Will Keith Kellogg invited him to join the Kellogg Company's board of directors. In 1939, he was appointed as the president of the Kellogg. During his tenure, the company saw growth, with sales increasing from $34 million to over $200 million and earnings growing four-fold. He oversaw international expansion, with the establishment of new plants in Australia and the United Kingdom, and the introduction of new products, such as Special K cereal in 1955.
