= Cereal City =

Cereal City may refer to:

- Battle Creek, Michigan
- Kellogg's Cereal City USA, former tourist attraction in Battle Creek (1998–2007)
