= Frosted Flakes =

WK Kellogg Co brand of sugar-coated corn flakes

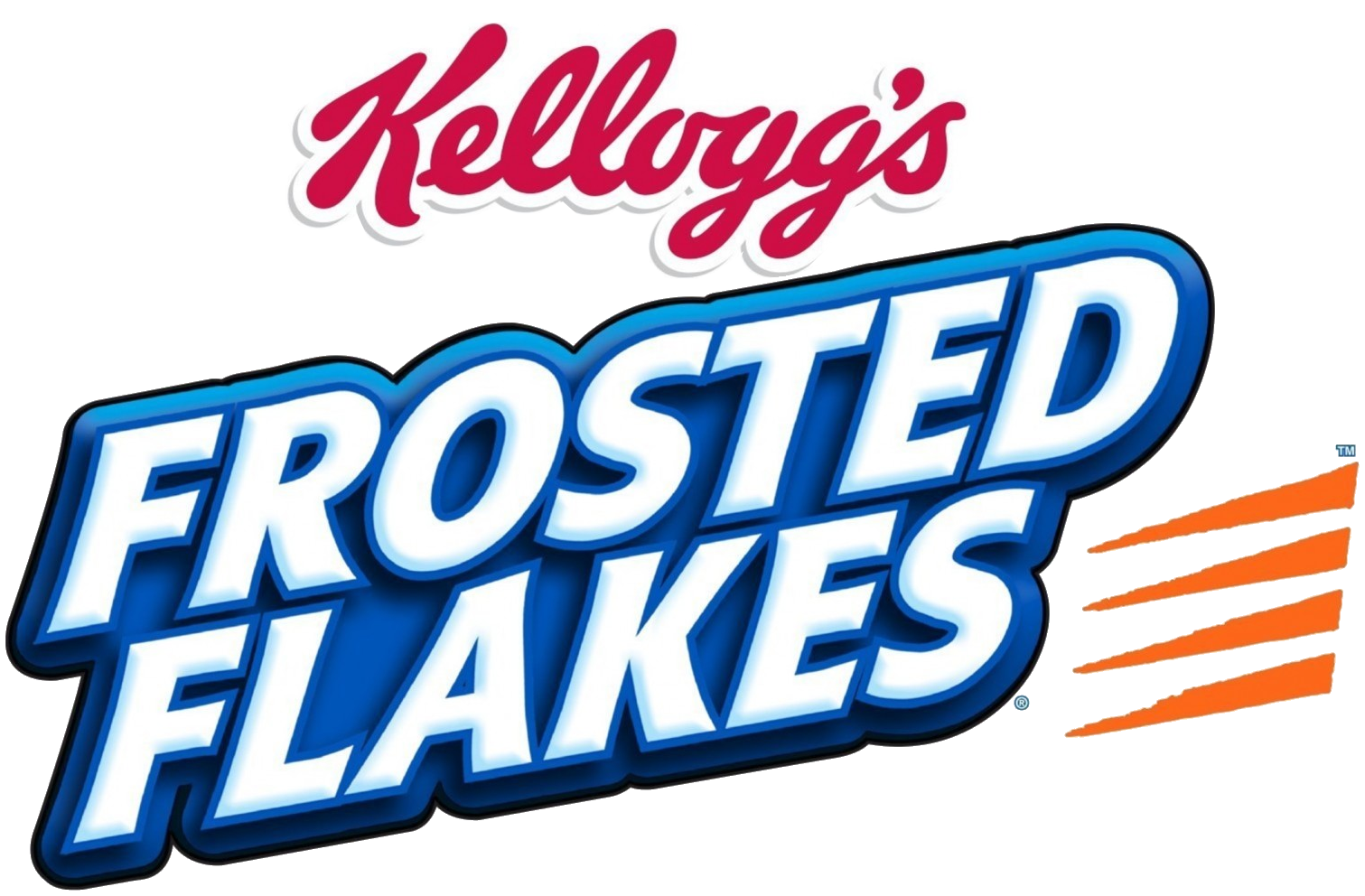

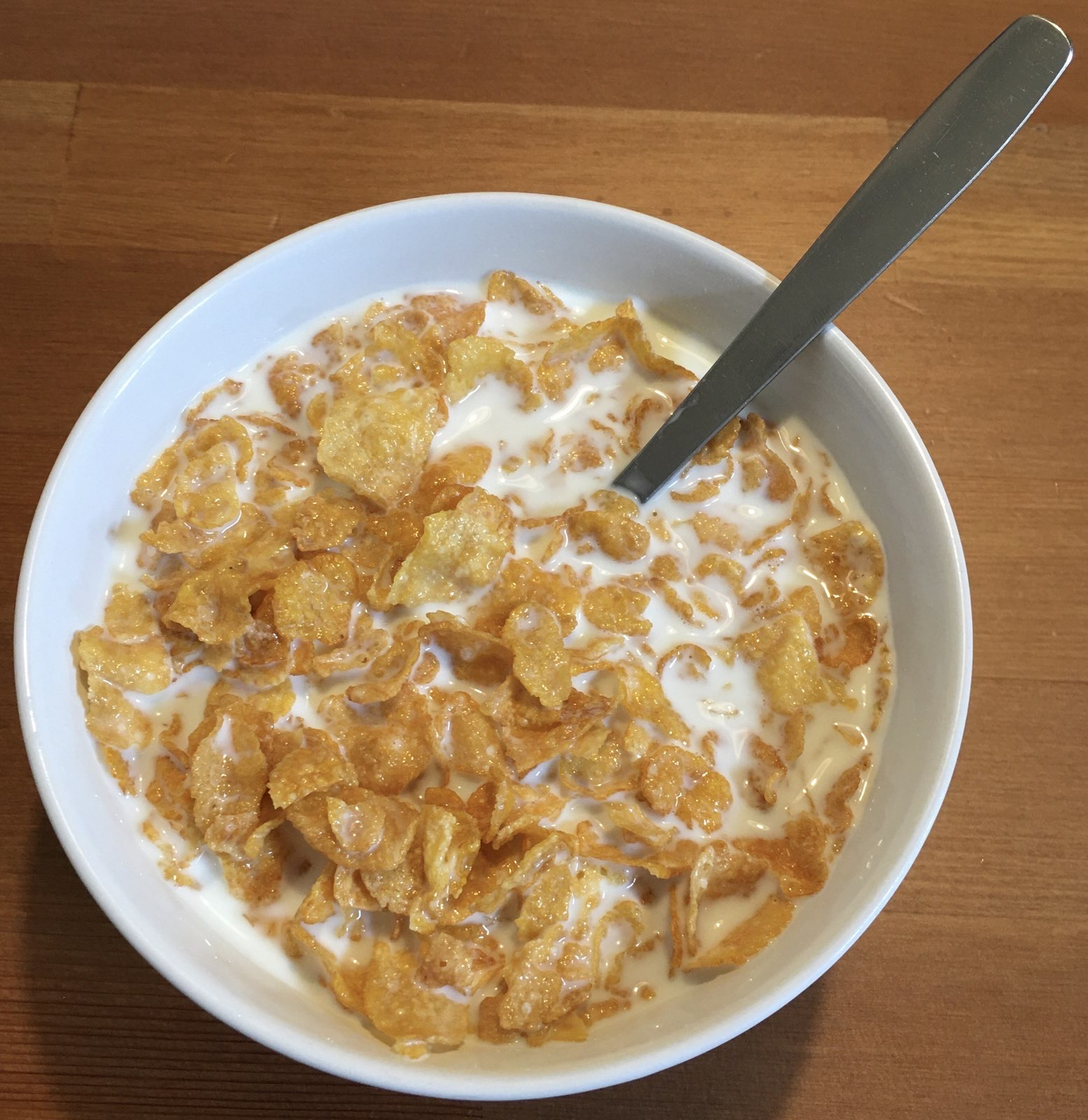
- Kellogg's Frosted Flakes (of corn), with milk
- Product type: Breakfast cereal
- Current owner: WK Kellogg Co (United States, Canada, Caribbean); Kellanova (rest of world)
- Country: United States
- Introduced: 1951; 75 years ago
- Previous owners: Kellogg's (1951–2023)
- Website: frostedflakes.com
- formerly = Sugar Frosted Flakes (1951)

Frosted Flakes or Frosties is a breakfast cereal, produced by WK Kellogg Co for the United States, Canada and the Caribbean and by Kellanova for the rest of the world, (Note: WK Kellogg consists only of the North American cereal business of the former Kellogg's, which also covers the Caribbean.) and consisting of sugar-coated corn flakes. It was introduced in the United States, in 1951, as "Sugar Frosted Flakes". The word "sugar" was dropped from the name in 1983.

Generic versions, such as store brands, are also available. Unlike many cereals, such as Cheerios, Shreddies and Rice Krispies but like Corn Flakes and Raisin Bran, the name “Frosted Flakes” is so generic that it cannot be trademarked, and thus it often shares its name with competitors.

Nutritional info
Nutritional value per 1 cup (29 grams)
- Energy: 460 kJ (110 kcal)
- Carbohydrates: 26 (9%)
- Sugars: 10 g
- Dietary fiber: <1 g (0%)
- Fat: 0 g (0%)
- Saturated: 0 g (0%)
- Protein: 1 g (2%)
- Other constituents: Quantity
- Cholesterol: 0 mg (0%)
- Values may be different outside US market.
- ^{†}Percentages estimated using US recommendations for adults.

== International names ==
- Frosted Flakes in United States and Canada
- Frosties in most Commonwealth nations (except Canada), European and Middle Eastern countries as well as Hong Kong, Taiwan and China; formerly Frostis in Spain
- Zucaritas in the United States and Hispanic America (the word translates as "little sugary things")
- Sucrilhos in Brazil (a fusion of sugar + crunch + milho (corn))
- Corn Frosty (コーンフロスティ) in Japan
- Corn Frost (콘푸로스트) in South Korea
- Tony Corn Flakes (東尼玉米片) in China

== Popularity ==
Frosted Flakes was the second-best-selling cereal in the first half of 2017 within the US in gross sales, after Honey Nut Cheerios.

== Marketing ==
=== Mascots ===
Tony the Tiger has been the mascot of Frosted Flakes since its introduction. Tony is known for saying the cereal's slogan: "They're Gr-r-reat!" (the "r"s in "Great" being drawn-out). Tony the Tiger was originally voiced by Dallas McKennon, but Thurl Ravenscroft voiced him for more than 50 years until his death in 2005. Tony was later voiced (in Canada and the United States) by former professional wrestling play-by-play announcer Lee Marshall until his death on April 27, 2014. After Marshall's death, he was replaced with Tex Brashear. In the UK, Tom Hill voiced Tony before and after Ravenscroft's death. Tony is drawn wearing a red bandana on all Frosted Flakes cereal boxes.

=== Sponsorship ===
- Kellogg's was a major sponsor of Adventures of Superman throughout most of the 1950s. Many of the Frosted Flakes commercials featuring the show's star George Reeves are available on the DVD release of the series' first season.
- Frosted Flakes is a sponsor of Challenger Sports British Soccer Camps.
- From the mid-1990s to the mid-2000s, Frosted Flakes was a sponsor of children's programming on PBS, including Sagwa, Dragon Tales and Barney & Friends.

=== Varieties ===
In Canada and the United States:

- Frosted Rice, a crisped rice variant introduced in 1977, similar to Frosted Rice Krispies and Ricicles. Featured a younger, similar mascot named Tony Jr.
- Birthday Confetti Frosted Flakes, a 1997 cake-flavored version. Discontinued in 1997.
- Cocoa Frosted Flakes, a 1997 cocoa-flavored version. Discontinued in 2000.
- Tony's Cinnamon Krunchers, a 2003 cinnamon-flavored variant. Discontinued around 2005.
- Whole Grain Tiger Power, a 2005 version with added protein, fiber and calcium, very similar to Start. Discontinued in 2006.
- Tony's Turboz, a 2005 meal replacement variant similar to Whole Grain Tiger Power. Available only in Canada.
- Frosted Flakes Gold, a 2008 honey-flavored variant. Reintroduced in 2018 as Honey Nut Frosted Flakes.
- Frosted Flakes Chocolate, a 2011 chocolate-flavored version. Reintroduced in 2013.
- Banana Frosted Flakes, a variant with flakes containing banana introduced in 1981. Discontinued in 1984.
- Cinnamon Frosted Flakes, a 2016 cinnamon-flavored version.
- Banana Creme Frosted Flakes, a limited edition banana creme-flavored version introduced in 2019.
- Cereal With Marshmallows, Variant of frosted flakes that includes vanilla flavored marshmallows
- Cinnamon French Toast, New flakes that are bursting with cinnamon sweetness
- Strawberry Milkshake, Strawberry flavor that makes milk into strawberry milk
- Cereal Bar, Bar made with traditional Frosted Flakes and marshmallows holding it together

In the UK and Ireland:

- Toffee Flavoured Frosties, Frosties with the taste of toffee, called Frosties Caramel in Europe (Tony - New Kelloggs Toffee Flavoured Frosties, an explosion of toffee taste, for a limited time only, they're gr-r-reat!). Limited time only.
- Frosties Chocolate, Frosties with the taste of chocolate (Tony - New Kelloggs Frosties Chocolate, discover the dark side!). Discontinued.
- Frosties Tiger Power, Frosted shredded wheat that is similar to Wheats cereal. Discontinued.
- Frosties Turbos, Frosties with chocolate lightning bolts. Discontinued.
- Reduced Sugar Frosties, Frosties with a third less sugar than regular Frosties. Discontinued.

In Brazil:

- Sucrilhos Sabor Chocolate, chocolate-flavored Frosted Flakes.
- Sucrilhos Power Pops, chocolate-flavored puffs, as opposed to flakes. Previously known as Sucrilhos Power.
- Sucrilhos Sabor Banana, banana-flavored Frosted Flakes. Discontinued.
- Sucrilhos Sabor Brigadeiro, brigadeiro-flavored Frosted Flakes. Limited.
- Sucrilhos Sabor Canela, cinnamon-flavored Frosted Flakes. Limited.
- Sucrilhos Sabor Doce de Leite, dulce de leche-flavored Frosted Flakes. Limited.

In 2020 Sucrilhos also started to be sold in the form of cookies.

In Argentina:

- Zucaritas Frutilla, strawberry-flavored Frosted Flakes.
- Choco Zucaritas, chocolate-flavored Frosted Flakes.

In Mexico:

- Choco Zucaritas, chocolate-flavored Frosted Flakes.

In Colombia:

- Zucaritas Arequipe, caramel-flavored Frosted Flakes. Discontinued.
- Zucaritas Power Balls, sphere-shaped Frosted Flakes.

== Health ==
Frosted Flakes, under its Australian name of Frosties, received 2 stars out of 5 on the Australian Government's health star ratings.

In the European Union, Frosted Flakes are ranked Nutri-Score D for "poor nutritional quality".
