= Bear Naked =

U.S. food company

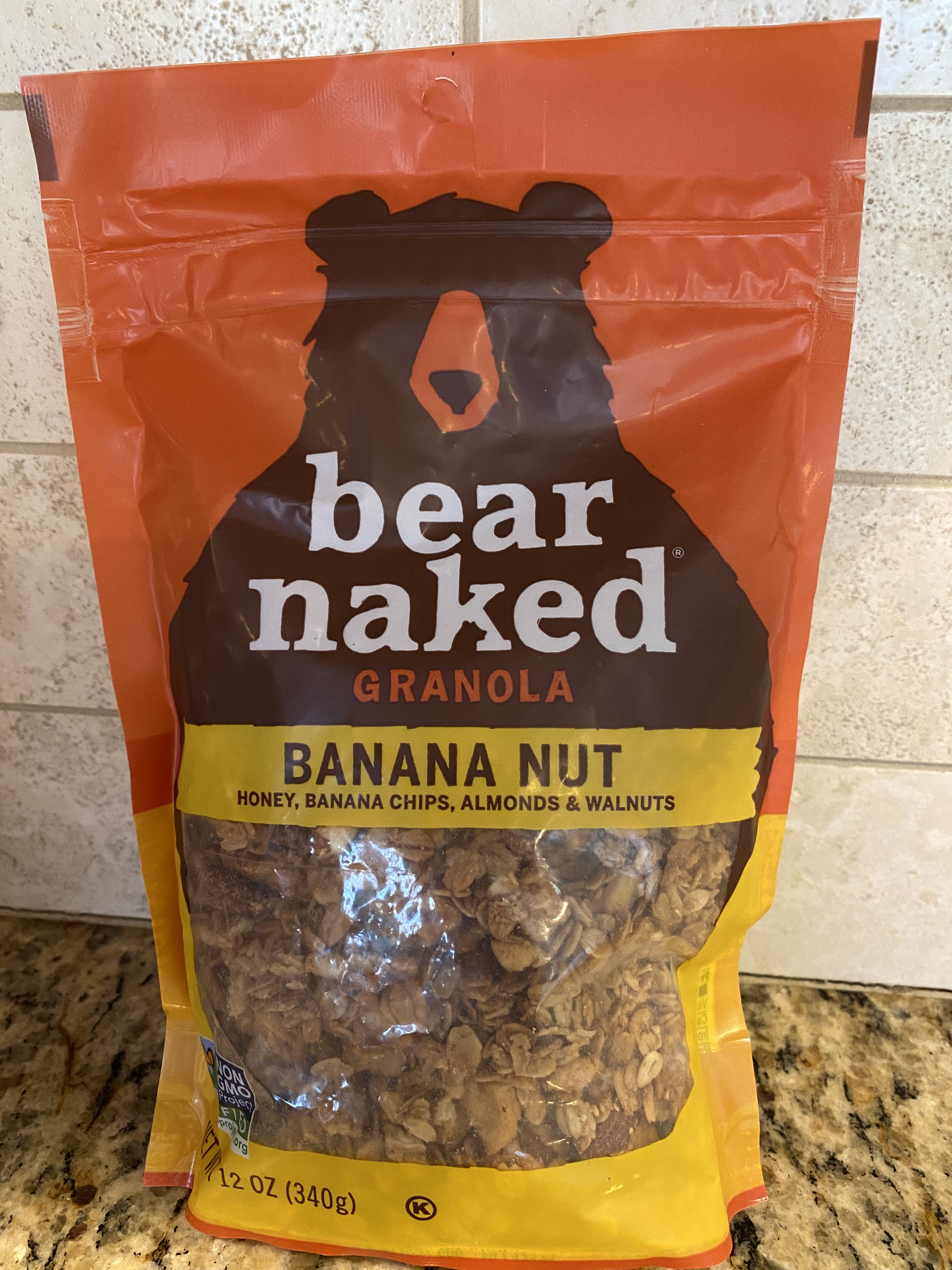
- Type: Subsidiary
- Industry: Consumer Goods
- Founded: 2002 Norwalk, Connecticut
- Founder: Brendan Synnott and Kelly Flatley
- Headquarters: La Jolla, San Diego, California, U.S.
- Products: Granola; Oatmeal
- Parent: WK Kellogg Co
- Website: http://www.bearnaked.com/

Bear Naked is a food company that makes whole grain granolas, granola bites, and oatmeal. The company was launched in 2002 by Kelly Flatley and Brendan Synnott. In 2007, Bear Naked was purchased by Kashi, a subsidiary of Kellogg's. Bear Naked is based out of La Jolla, California. As of 2023, the company is owned by WK Kellogg Co.

== History ==
Kelly Flatley and Brendan Synnott are the co-founders of Bear Naked granola. Flatley came up with the name – “bear” which evoked the outdoors, while “naked” implied the absence of additives. In college, Flatley made granola in her dorm room and shared it with friends. Flatley met Synnott in 2002 in Darien, Connecticut. Flatley was making her granola through the night and delivering it to local stores the next morning. They became business partners and began using a commercial kitchen. They were the only employees of the company at the time, so they created, distributed, and marketed the granola themselves. Initially, commercial distributors would not sell them raw materials, so they bought bulk from their local Costco. Synnott and Flatley pitched their products to organic and natural markets and increased the company's presence in stores. In 2003, Stew Leonard's supermarket chain in New York picked up their granola, which helped pull the company into commercial success.

=== Acquisition by Kellogg's ===
In 2007, Flatley and Synnott were approached by Kashi, a subsidiary of the Kellogg Company. The partners sold Bear Naked for over $60 million. Flatley and Synnott stayed for a year to make a smooth transition to the new parent company. Today, Kellogg's Kashi Co. organic unit manages the Bear Naked brand, from La Jolla, California.

== Marketing ==
=== Design ===
For its initial design, Bear Naked used a logo with three slashes suggesting bear claw marks. They chose a bear symbol because of its appetite for nuts, fruit, and honey. After a redesign in 2015, “Kevin” the bear was introduced. He now appears on all packaging, social media, and the company website. The new design uses orange, the signature color of Bear Naked's flagship Fruit and Nut granola. The color is meant to be energetic and hopes to appeal to millennials and others with active lives.

=== Packaging ===
Bear Naked's marketing strategy included presenting its product in a resealable cellophane pouch with a transparent window. In 2019, Bear Naked made its stand-up pouch from 100% recyclable materials.

== Products ==
=== Classic Granola ===
- Banana Nut
- Cacao and Cashew
- Fruit & Nut
- Maple Pecan
- Peanut Butter
- Triple Berry

=== Bear Naked Granola Fit (Reduced Sugar) ===
- Vanilla Almond
- Peanut Butter Crunch

=== Gluten-Free and Grain Free ===
- Maple Cinnamon
- Chocolate Almond

=== Protein Granola ===
- Original Cinnamon
- Honey Almond

=== Granola bites ===
- Dark Chocolate Sea Salt (Chewy)
- Peanut Butter and Honey (Chewy)
- Honey Oat (Crunchy)
- Chocolate Chip (Crunchy)

=== Oatmeal ===
- Maple Pecan Steel Cut Oatmeal and Crunchy Granola Topper
- Fruit and Nut Steel Cut Oatmeal and Crunchy Granola Topper
