= Tony the Tiger =

American advertising cartoon mascot

- Concept art for Chuck Gammage Animation by Daryl Graham
- First appearance: 1952
- Created by: The Kellogg Company
- Portrayed by: Hugh Grant (Unfrosted)
- Voiced by: Dallas McKennon (1952–1953); Thurl Ravenscroft (1953–2005; US), (1953–1999; UK); Lee Marshall (1999–2005; understudy and singing voice, 2005–2014; full-time); Tex Brashear (2014–present); Tony Daniels (2005–present; Canada); Tom Clarke Hill (1999–present; UK); Jeff Morrow II (1999); Andy Nagraj (2019–present); Keith Scott (1991–1999; Australia); Kenji Utsumi (1991–2013; Japanese); Yūga Kagami (2021–present; Japanese)

In-universe information
- Species: Tiger
- Gender: Male
- Family: Papa Tony (father); Mama Tony (mother)
- Spouse: Mrs. Tony
- Children: Tony Jr. (son); Antoinette (daughter)

Tony the Tiger is the advertising cartoon anthropomorphic tiger mascot for Frosted Flakes (also known as Frosties) breakfast cereal, appearing on its packaging and advertising. After the original Kellogg Company spun off its North American cereal business in late 2023, the mascot is owned by WK Kellogg Co in the U.S., Canada, and Caribbean markets and by Kellanova in the rest of the world. Tony has also been the mascot for related cereals such as Tony's Cinnamon Krunchers and Tiger Power. Since Tony's debut in 1952, the character has spanned several generations and has become a breakfast cereal icon.

== History ==
In 1952, Eugene Kolkey, an accomplished graphics artist and art director at Leo Burnett, created a character that was to become the official mascot of Kellogg's new breakfast cereal. Kolkey designed a tiger named Tony (named after an ad man at Leo Burnett—Raymond Anthony Wells) and selected Martin Provensen for the finished artwork. The cereal had other mascots like Katy the Kangaroo, Elmo the Elephant, and Newt the Gnu. Within the year, the other mascots were dropped (with Elmo and Newt never once gracing the front of the box), and Tony was given a son, Tony Jr. Tony the Tiger eventually became a cereal icon. The final Tony the Tiger design came from a group of former Disney animators known as Quartet Films, which also designed the Jolly Green Giant, Snap, Crackle and Pop, the Hamm's Beer Bear, and the Baltimore Orioles mascot, among others. Stan Walsh, Art Babbitt, Arnold Gillesspie, and Michael Lah were the artists/filmmakers that formed the Quartet Films of Hollywood.

A 1955 print ad in Life had Tony taking a microphone away from You Bet Your Life host Groucho Marx and saying, "You bet your life they're Gr-r-reat!"

A recognizable and distinct voice was needed for the Tony the Tiger character. Initially, he was voiced by Dallas McKennon, but shortly after the initial Sugar Frosted Flakes advertisements aired, McKennon was replaced by Thurl Ravenscroft, who spent the next five decades providing the characteristic deep bass voice associated with the character, notably the familiar "They're gr-r-reat!" catchphrase. Thurl Ravenscroft came up with this phrase. Ravenscroft spoke to an interviewer of injecting his personality into Tony: "I made Tony a person. For me, Tony was real. I made him become a human being and that affected the animation and everything."

In 1958, Tony appeared on Kellogg's cereal boxes with Hanna-Barbera characters such as Huckleberry Hound and Snagglepuss.

Tony began to be humanized in the 1970s; he was given an Italian-American nationality and consumers were briefly introduced to more of Tony's family including Mama Tony, Mrs. Tony, and a daughter, Antoinette. Tony was a popular figure among the young Italian-American population and it showed in 1974, where he was deemed "Tiger of the Year" in an advertising theme taken from the Chinese Lunar Calendar. The advertising theme declared, "This is the Year of the Tiger and Tony is the Tiger of the Year." Later that year, Tony graced the covers of Italian GQ and Panorama. In addition to Tony's success, during this decade, son Tony Jr. was even given his own short-lived cereal in 1975, Frosted Rice. Provensen's original art design for the tiger has changed significantly over the years, as Tony the whimsical, cereal-box-sized tiger with a teardrop-shaped head was replaced by his fully-grown son Jr., who is now a sleek, muscular sports enthusiast—he was a coach for the Monster Wrestlers in My Pocket and a referee for the Monster Sports Stars in My Pocket (see Monster in My Pocket). Tony the Tiger was never limited to American cereal boxes, appearing on Kellogg's European brand cereal boxes.

Tony frequently appears in American commercials as an animated character in a live-action world, frequently with his drawn image rotoscoped over a live character, such as an extreme sports athlete, allowing Tony to not just appear in live-action, but interact as well.

The longtime voice of Tony, Thurl Ravenscroft, died in 2005. In North America, he was replaced from 2005 onwards by announcer Lee Marshall, who maintained the role until his death from cancer in 2014. In the United Kingdom, Tony is voiced by Californian-born British actor, Tom Clarke Hill. For some time in the UK, the rock song "Eye of the Tiger" by Survivor was used in conjunction with Tony's viewings. In Canada, Tony is voiced by animation, commercial, and promo voice artist Tony Daniels.

"Put a Tiger on Your Team" was featured in advertisements all across the United States in 1958 as Kellogg's cereal campaign reached out to all children sports organizations and teams to build more consumers. In the same year of 1958, Tony the Tiger was joined by other popular mascots to promote the newest cereal release "pre-sweetened cereals." Mass media and marketing during this time was on the rise, especially in the food product industry. In the wake of Kellogg's Frosted Flakes the cereal company's goal was to produce a flavor that was "delicious and distinctive flavor." In 1974, after the Kellogg Company launched a Chinese Year of the Tiger, for marketing and advertising techniques Tony was selected as Tiger of the Year. Following a few months later was the release of an innovative Tony the Tiger commercial. This commercial was significant in the humanizing factor of Tony with the birth of his first daughter, Antoinette. This advertising technique targeted the millions of infants as Antoinette the baby tigress was shown tasting Kellogg's Sugar Frosted Flakes for the first time, followed by the Tony the Tiger slogan. The shape of the featured tiger was beginning to shape the cereal marketing and advertising sector by promoting new product lines. The company used Tony Jr. as its mascot to introduce nearly six new products that are high in nutrition in the mid-1970s. Throughout all of the 1970s, Tony the Tiger had a complete family of three. The evolution of this brand icon continued to rise as Tony the Tiger was featured in a Hot Air Balloon Championship in 1981.

In 2019, it was announced that Kellogg's would become the title sponsor of the Sun Bowl, an El Paso, Texas-based college football bowl game, with the game being branded as the Tony the Tiger Sun Bowl. The sponsorship transferred to WK Kellogg after the 2023 corporate split.

In August 2022, Tony the Tiger made his debut as a VTuber on Twitch.

== Character design ==
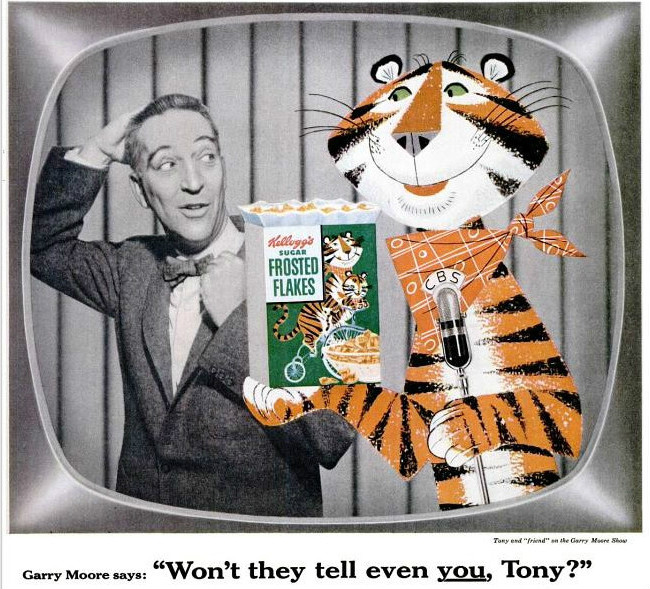
Cartoon character Tony the Tiger with a TV personality in a 1955 print advertisement for Kellogg's cereal

Tony's design has changed over the course of the character's history. The original Tony the Tiger was more typically tiger-like in shape and was sometimes depicted walking on all fours; he wore a kerchief around his neck and had a football-shaped head. Ultimately, this was tweaked into a more muscular, human-like form.

== Trademark controversy ==
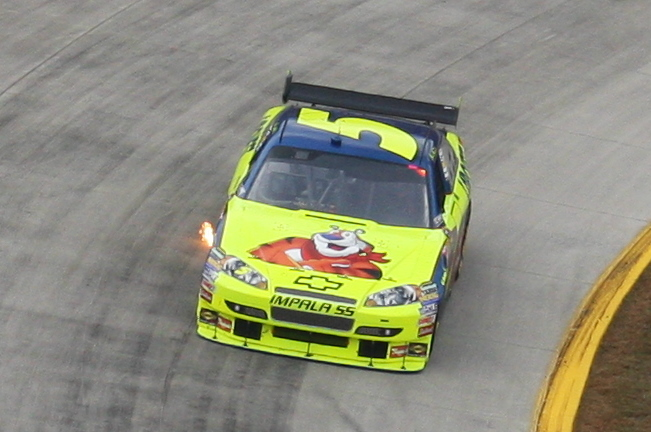
Mark Martin's No. 5 Kellogg's/Carquest Chevrolet at Martinsville Speedway in 2009

Tony the Tiger began his trademark debut with Kellogg in 1952. The Tiger was used as a cartoon character featured on every box of Kellogg's Frosted Flakes. The feline was federally registered as Kellogg's Frosted Flakes trademark. Furthermore, the registration and classification was under food products. Twelve years later one of the top oil companies, Esso (now ExxonMobil), began using a similar tiger as a promotional mascot for gasoline products. Exxon then followed through with protocol and federally registered its tiger under the petroleum products category. Unlike the Kellogg slogan behind the voice of Thurl Ravenscroft, "They’re gr-r-reat!", Esso also had a slogan, "Put a tiger in your tank".

The two major companies shared peaceful relations between the two iconic tigers. From 1952 to 1995, the companies combined spent over a billion and a half dollars in advertising in the cereal and petroleum industries. Neither company faced any issues with each other—however, in 1992 this all changed. ExxonMobil opened a new business sector and product line through the promotion of the existing Exxon Tiger. The company failed to expand its federal trademark registration to its newest product line sector. Prior to Exxon's newest business addition of opening convenience stores ("Tiger Marts") and selling foods and beverages, the company was cleared of all trademark litigations. After the announcement of ExxonMobil's new product line, Kellogg quickly filed a suit. The latest unnamed tiger Exxon was using to sell food and beverages crossed the trademark boundaries. The confusion of using very similar tigers as a mascot for food products did not sit well with Kellogg. The lawsuit consisted of trademark infringement and dilution, and sought an injunction prohibiting the further use of the Exxon tiger. After several court appearances, millions of dollars, different rulings, and years of waiting, the two parties settled the case.

Tracing back to 1986, Kellogg battled with a different situation with regard to trademark. During the preparation of the 1988 Summer Olympics South Korean organizers agreed on the games' mascot Hodori which was very similar to Kellogg's Tony the Tiger. The very popular cereal company had concerns about the similarity and raised some red flags with trademark registration that same year. Kellogg continued to stress that Tony the Tiger was an advertising tool used on almost every cereal box, so a comparable tiger only differentiated by the addition of distinct five-ringed Olympic badge around his neck would cause confusion. Sports news and critics stirred up much controversy and it is remembered as the "Hold That Tiger" battle for the tiger trademark.

== Health concerns and legal status across countries ==
Tony the Tiger, as well as other mascots featured in products targeted to children (such as Chester Cheetah and fellow Kellogg's mascots such as Toucan Sam), has been the subject of controversy in several countries. A study published in the journal Obesity Reviews, suggested familiar media character branding appeared to be "a powerful influence on children's preferences, choices and intake of less healthy foods." Tony and similar mascots, have been banned from being featured in packaging and advertising in countries like Chile, Peru, Argentina and Mexico. A study by a coalition that included Action on Sugar and Children's Food Campaign in the UK, found that 51% of 526 assessed "child-friendly" food and drink products with popular cartoon characters on their packaging were high in sugar, saturated fat, salt and fat, with only 18 healthy products such as fruit, vegetables and water were found to use child-friendly cartoons. Tom Watson of the Labour Party said using playful characters to appeal to children is "grossly irresponsible", and the Health and Social Care Select Committee issued calls for a blanket ban on "brand-generated characters or licensed TV and film characters which are used to promote foods high in fat, sugar or salt". Consumption of sugar-sweetened drinks dropped 25 percent in the 18 months after Chile adopted these regulations, which also included octagon front-of-package warning labels and a ban on junk food in schools.

== See also ==
- List of breakfast cereal advertising characters
- List of fictional cats
