= Gardenburger =

American brand of veggie burgers

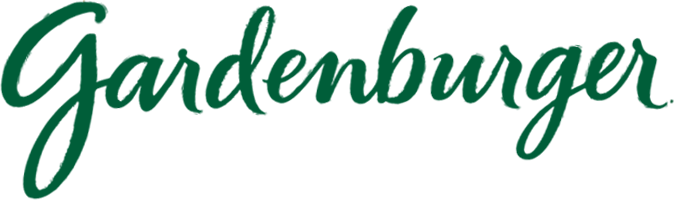
- Product type: Veggie burger
- Current owner: Kellanova
- Country: U.S.
- Introduced: c. 1981; 45 years ago
- Website: gardenburger.com

Gardenburger is the brand name of a veggie burger sold in the United States. It was developed in the early 1980s by Paul Wenner, the owner of the Gardenhouse, a vegetarian restaurant in Gresham, Oregon. It is currently owned by Kellanova.

== History ==
The Gardenburger was developed by Paul Wenner around 1981 or 1982 in Wenner's vegetarian restaurant, The Gardenhouse, in Gresham, Oregon. The company was incorporated as Wholesome & Hearty Foods, Inc., in March 1985. Initial funding was given to founders Paul Wenner and Allyn Smaaland as part of a venture capital investment program of Louisiana-Pacific Corp., whereby L-P took immediate controlling interest. A second round of venture capital financing was provided about a year later.

In 2005, Gardenburger filed for bankruptcy, though it continued operation by becoming privately held.

In 2006, Gardenburger announced that it had taken eggs out of all of its products except for one private-sourced item, which now contains organic, cage-free eggs.

In 2006, the company changed its name back to Wholesome & Hearty Foods.

In 2007, the Kellogg Company purchased the Wholesome & Hearty Foods company.

== Products ==
The company makes a variety of vegetarian and vegan products and meat substitutes. According to the company's website, the original Gardenburger was made from mushrooms, onions, brown rice, rolled oats, cheese, eggs, garlic, and spices. Gardenburger is a registered trademark of the Wholesome and Hearty Foods Company, a subsidiary of Kellogg Company.

Although all Gardenburger products are vegetarian, some of them are not vegan and include animal-derived ingredients such as eggs or dairy products, such as milk and cheese.

In 2012, Gardenburger sold five types of veggie burgers: Veggie medley (vegan), The Original (vegetarian), Black Bean Chipotle Veggie Burger (vegan), Sun-Dried Tomato Basil (vegetarian), and Portabella (vegetarian).

== See also ==
- List of meat substitutes
