= WK Kellogg Co =

North American cereal company

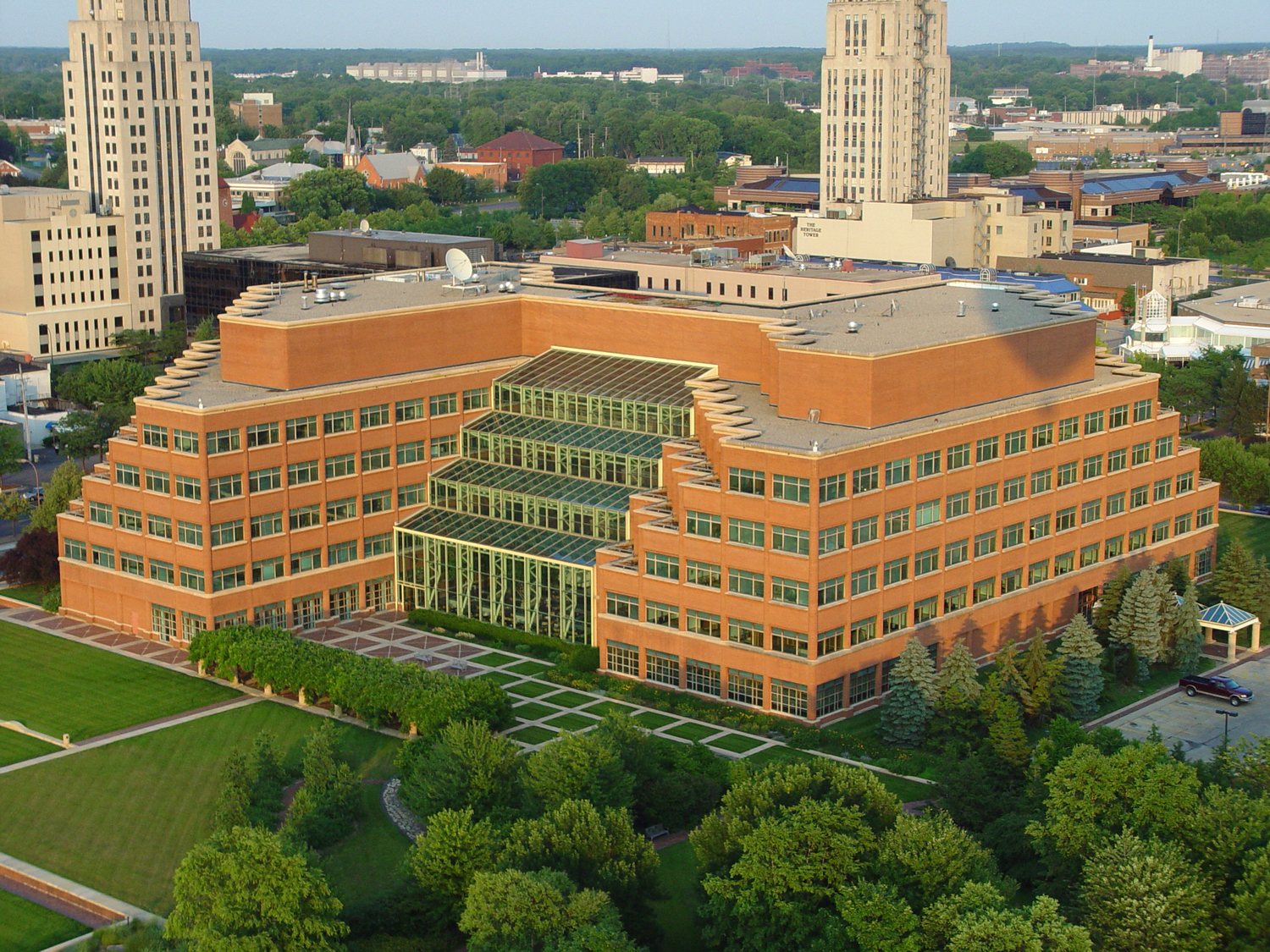
- Headquarters in Battle Creek, Michigan
- Type: Subsidiary
- Traded as: NYSE: KLG (2023–2025)
- Industry: Food
- Predecessor: Kellogg's (now named Kellanova)
- Founded: October 2, 2023; 3 years ago
- Headquarters: Battle Creek, Michigan, United States
- Area served: North America
- Products: Breakfast cereal
- Brands: See below
- Revenue: ▼US$2.71 billion (2024)
- Operating income: ▲US$109 million (2024)
- Net income: ▼US$72 million (2024)
- Total assets: ▲US$1.96 billion (2024)
- Total equity: ▲US$317 million (2024)
- Number of employees: 3,280 (2024)
- Parent: Ferrero
- Website: wkkellogg.com

WK Kellogg Co (Note: The official legal name of the company, as registered with the Delaware secretary of state and the U.S. Securities and Exchange Commission, does not follow the traditional American English convention of terminating the abbreviation "Co" (for Company) with a period.) is an American food manufacturing company, split from Kellogg's on October 2, 2023, and headquartered in Battle Creek, Michigan. It was formed in October 2023 as part of Kellogg's spin-off of its North American breakfast cereal business, and it existed as an independent company for about two years before being acquired.

It was purchased by Ferrero SpA in September 2025.

== History ==
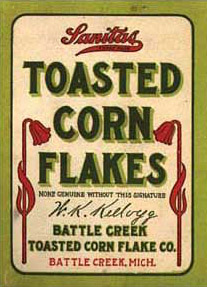
First Battle Creek Toasted Corn Flake Co. Corn Flakes package (1906), later to become the Kellogg Food Company in 1908

On October 2, 2023, WK Kellogg Co (named after Will Keith Kellogg, one of the original founders of the Kellogg's company) was spun off from the Kellogg Company and listed on the New York Stock Exchange. While the Kellogg Company, renamed Kellanova, focused on non-cereal products outside North America, WK Kellogg would produce cereals for the North American market.

On January 4, 2024, WK Kellogg introduced its first vegan cereal, Eat Your Mouth Off. On August 6, it announced that it would close a plant in Omaha, Nebraska at the end of 2026, and reduce production at a plant in Memphis, Tennessee from late 2025; on the other hand, plants in Battle Creek, Michigan, Lancaster, Pennsylvania and Belleville, Ontario would see increased production. $100 million would be spent on restructuring, and $390 million to purchase new technology and infrastructure.

WK Kellogg retained the original Kellogg's practice of using petroleum-based food coloring, which has been linked to autoimmune disorders, cancer, endocrine disease, hyperactivity and obesity. Protesters gathered at the company's headquarters to demand the removal of all artificial colors, and Texas Attorney General Ken Paxton launched an investigation of the company's claims that its products were healthy. WK Kellogg promised to fulfill the protesters' wishes by the end of 2027, reportedly being the first company to sign an Assurance of Voluntary Compliance, a legally binding agreement, with Paxton.

On May 6, 2025, the company predicted that due to poor revenue and significant import tariffs imposed after Donald Trump regained the presidency, its net sales would decrease from the previous financial year.

WK Kellogg quickly put itself up for sale. After considering offers from Cerberus Capital Management and consumer foods investor Dean Metropoulos, it agreed to be acquired by Ferrero for $3.1 billion. The deal, announced on July 10, 2025, caused stock prices to increase by 30 percent. On September 19, shareholders approved the buyout, and on September 26, it was closed.

On August 18, 2025, Honey Smacks (marketed as Smacks) were made available in the UK at Morrisons supermarkets. The taste reminded consumers of Sugar Puffs before that cereal was rebranded to Honey Monster Puffs. In late January 2026, the company released three limited-edition flavors of Froot Loops: Cocoa Loops, Glazed Donut Holes and Sweethearts.

In early February 2026, Ferrero chose Jean-Baptiste Santoul as the chief operating officer of WK Kellogg. On March 3, it was announced that Lapo Civiletti would become the new president of the company on September 1.

== Data breach ==
On February 27, 2025, WK Kellogg Co learned that it became a victim of a data breach. They reported it to Cleo Communications, which confirmed that the data breach took place on December 7, 2024. WK Kellogg reported the attack to the Maine Attorney General on April 4, they did this after one employee in the state had their name and social security number stolen. They notified the employee and offered them credit monitoring, it also required all of its vendors and CLEO to add strict security protocols. Clop was responsible for the ransomware attack on Cleo.

== Finances ==
In 2024, Froot Loops, Frosted Flakes, Frosted Mini Wheats, Raisin Bran, Rice Krispies and Special K made up seventy percent of the sales.

== Interview controversy ==
In an interview with CNBC, CEO Gary Pilnick said this:

"Consumers are under pressure...so we're advertising about cereal for dinner... Cereal for dinner is something that is probably more on trend now, and we would expect to continue as that consumer is under pressure. The cereal category is a place that a lot of folks might come to because the price of a bowl of cereal with milk and with fruit is less than a dollar. So you can imagine why a consumer under pressure might find that to be a good place to go. If you think about the cost of cereal for a family versus what they might otherwise do, that's going to be much more affordable."

Peter Welch after seeing the interview said: "A worker at Kellogg's making $20 an hour would have to work 96 years to equal the $4 million that CEO Gary Pilnick makes annually. People don't need to eat cereal for dinner, they need corporations to stop ripping them off." Marianne Williamson also responded by saying: "Advertising to hungry people that cereal might be good for dinner is not meeting people where they are. It's exploiting the hungry for financial gain." TikTok user James Li said this: "And how do you think consumers became under pressure? It's companies like Kellogg that have used the excuse of inflation in order to price gauge [sic] consumers."

== Marketing ==
In early January 2026, it was announced that Raisin Bran would appear in a Super Bowl ad for the first time, ending a fifteen-year Kellogg's absence. William Shatner appeared in the ad as a captain of a spaceship, hinting of his former role as James T. Kirk. On April 26, children cereals began offering toy spoons shaped like Buzz Lightyear, Jessie and Woody; trading cards and movie ticket promotions for Toy Story 5. It is part of WK Kellogg's 'Toys Back in the Box' campaign, a collaboration with The Walt Disney Studios. Ten years ago was the last time prizes were offered.

== Brands ==
Brands include:

- All-Bran
- Apple Jacks
- Cocoa Krispies
- Corn Flakes
- Corn Pops
- Cracklin' Oat Bran
- Crispix
- Froot Loops
- Frosted Flakes
- Frosted Mini-Wheats
- Honey Smacks
- Kashi
- Krave
- Bear Naked
- Raisin Bran
- Rice Krispies
- Special K
