= Rxbar =

Brand of protein bars

RXBAR
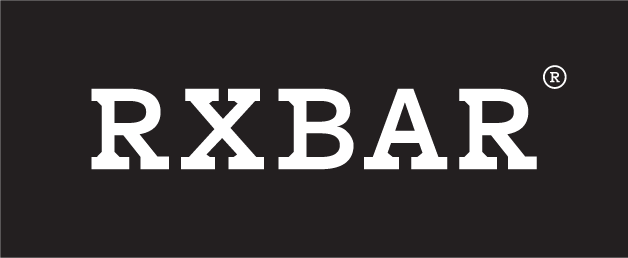

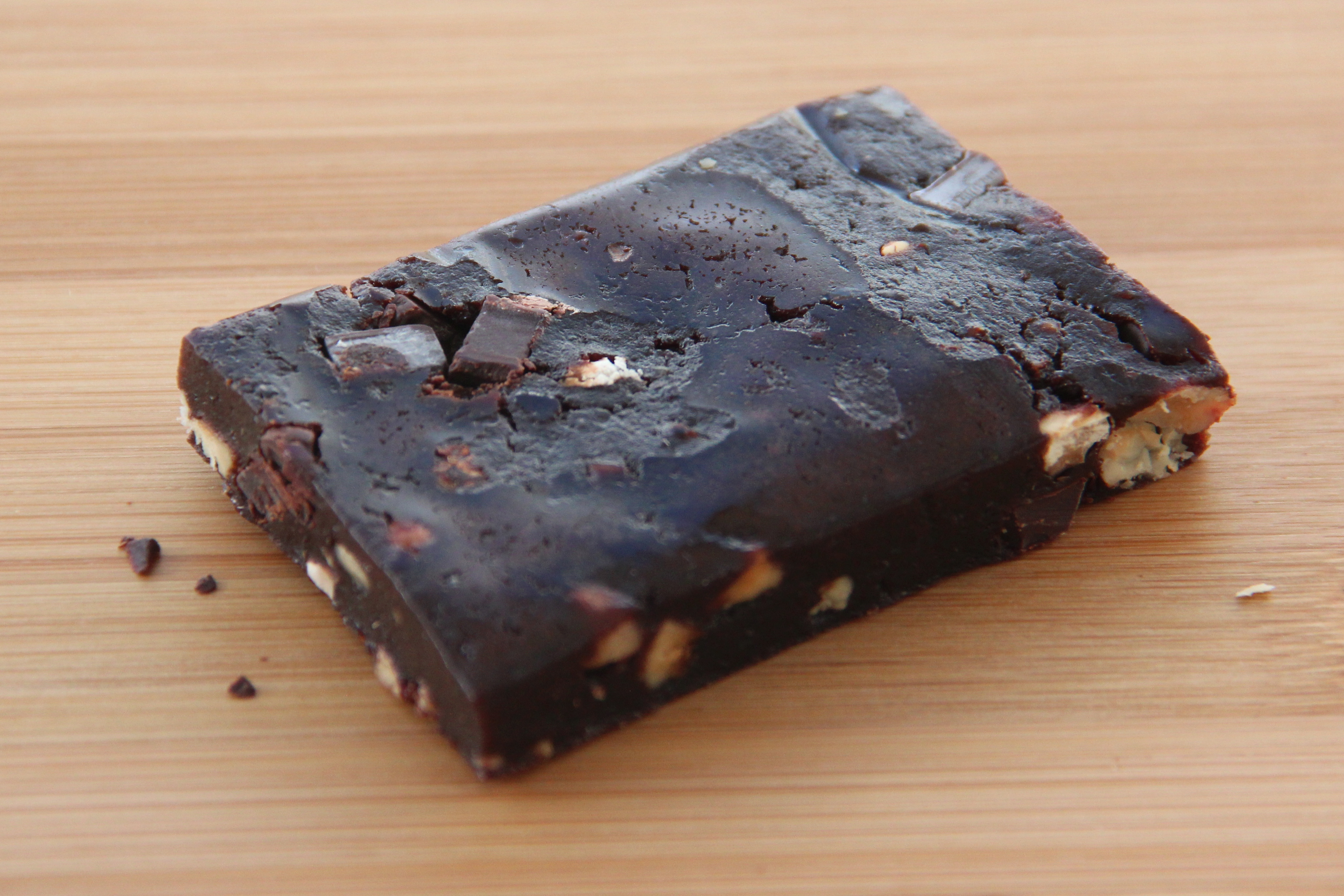
- A chocolate hazelnut flavor RXBAR
- Product type: Protein bars
- Current owner: Mars Inc. (via Kellanova)
- Produced by: Insurgent Brands LLC
- Introduced: 2013
- Website: www.rxbar.com

RXBAR is a brand of protein bars produced by Insurgent Brands LLC, a subsidiary of Kellanova. It is made with egg whites, dried fruit, nuts, and dates.

RXBAR products were conceived and initially manufactured by Peter Rahal and Jared Smith, beginning in 2013. Their company, Chicago Bar Co., was acquired by Kellogg's in 2017, and later became part of Kellanova, a spin-off of Kellogg's and eventually, part of Mars Inc.

== History ==
Peter Rahal made the first RXBAR in 2013 in his parents' basement in Glen Ellyn, Illinois with co-founder Jared Smith. Their original recipe used dates, egg whites, coconut, chocolate, and other nuts and dried fruits. Rahal's family, who operated a food manufacturing firm, assisted in sourcing ingredients at favorable prices. The bars were initially marketed directly to CrossFit gyms, and expanded to direct-to-consumer sales via Amazon Marketplace. The packaging of the bars was redesigned in 2015 to emphasize the ingredients list, and Whole Foods Market began carrying RXBAR products that year.

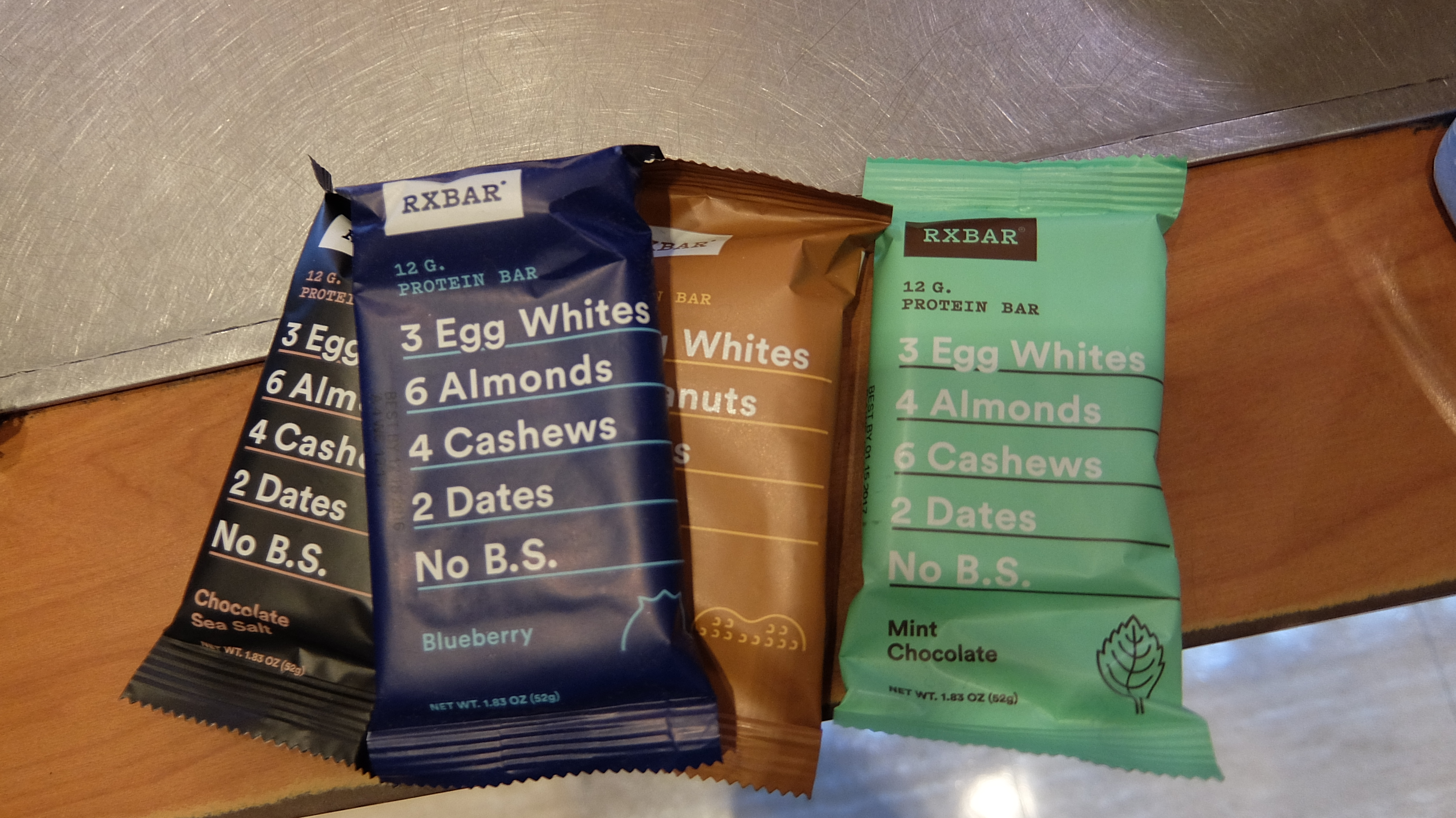
RXBar wrappers

Rahal and Smith's company, Chicago Bar Co., grew to employ 75 people. In October 2017, the company was acquired by Kellogg's for $600 million. Under the new ownership, the brand has launched additional products, including a line of nut butters that contain egg whites for added protein.

Chicago Bar Co. laid off 20% of its staff in December 2018, totaling 40 employees. Shortly afterwards in January 2019, the company recalled 15 flavors of RXBAR and RXBAR Kids protein bars after discovering that they were contaminated with peanuts. Chicago Bar Co. was rebranded as Insurgent Brands in March 2019, and Rahal moved to a non-executive position in the company.

== Products ==
The main RXBAR brand currently has 11 flavors. This includes Vanilla Almond, Strawberry, Chocolate Sea Salt, Peanut Butter, Banana Chocolate Walnut, Chocolate Chip, Coconut Chocolate, Blueberry, Peanut Butter Chocolate, Mixed Berry, and Mint Chocolate. They also have bars with the label of "Nut Butter and Oat" which currently offer the 3 flavors of Honey Cinnamon Peanut Butter, Blueberry Cashew Butter, and Dark Chocolate Peanut Butter.
