= Special K =

Brand of cereal and meal bars

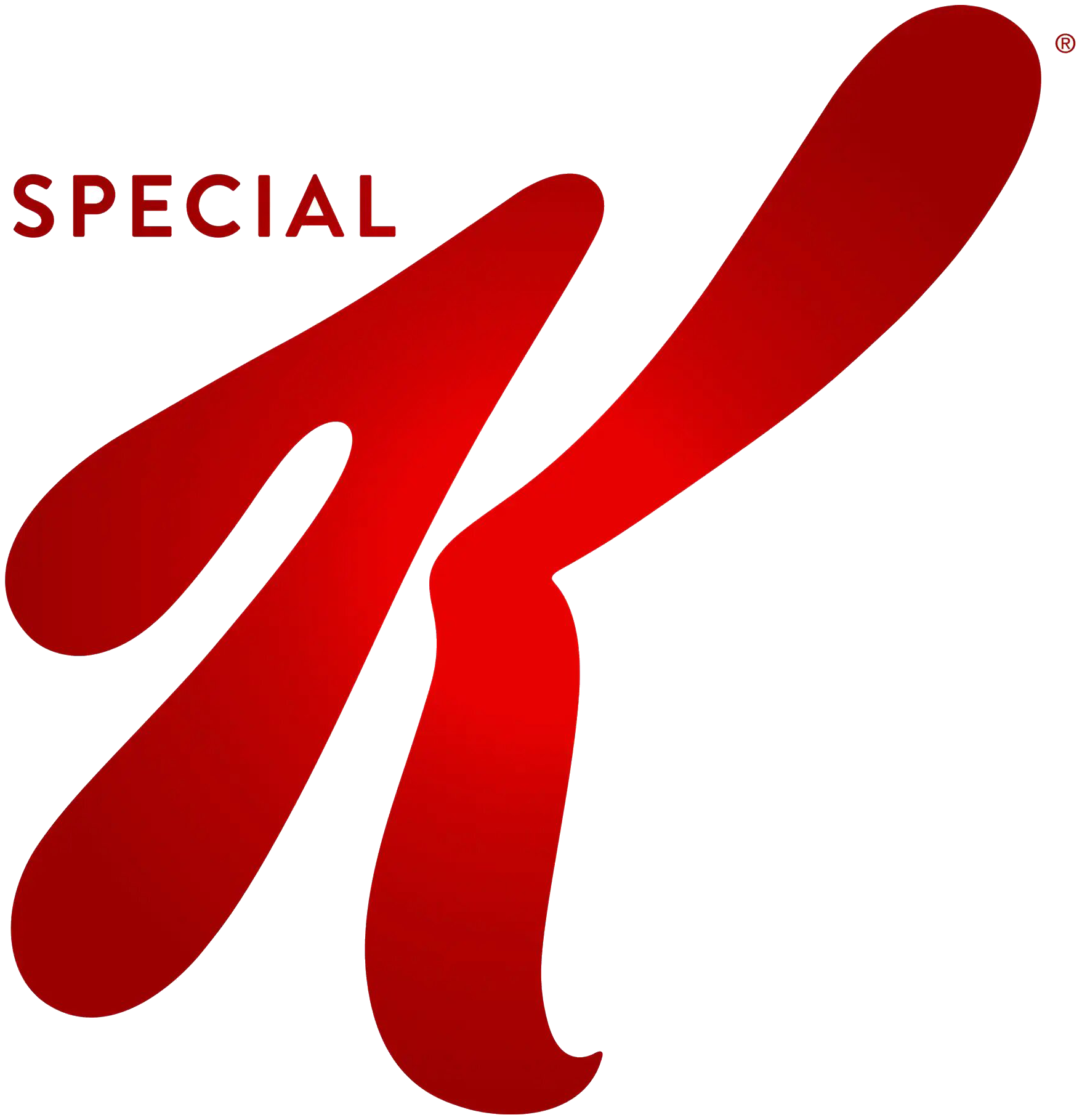

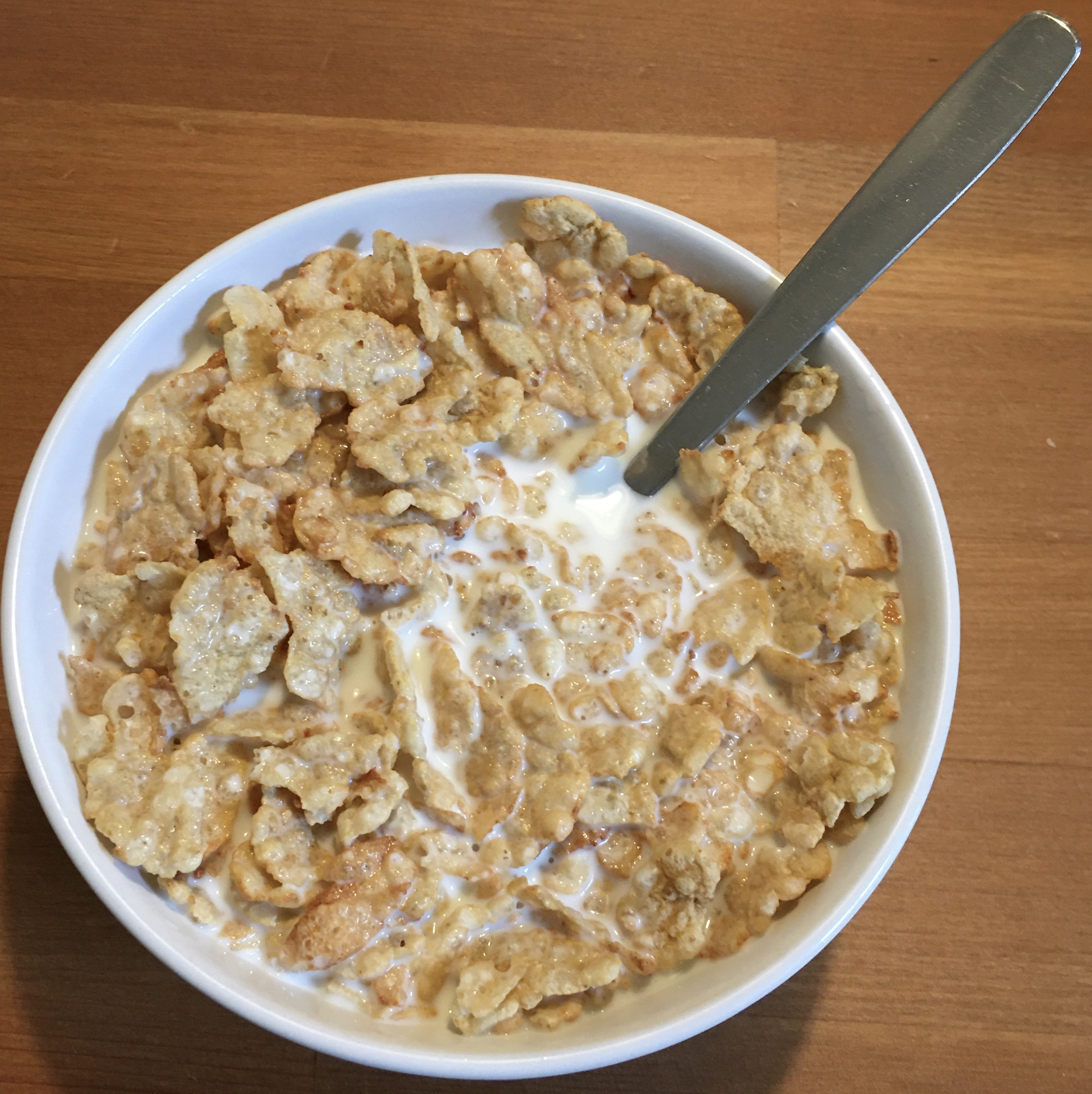
- Kellogg's Special K Original – Toasted Rice Cereal, with milk
- Product type: Breakfast cereal, cereal bar
- Current owner: WK Kellogg Co (cereal, North America); Kellanova (cereal, rest of world; meal bars)
- Country: U.S.
- Introduced: 1955; 71 years ago
- Previous owners: Kellogg's (1955–2023)
- Website: specialk.com

Special K is an American brand of breakfast cereal and meal bars originally manufactured by Kellogg's. The cereal was introduced to the United States in 1955. It is made primarily from grains such as lightly toasted rice, wheat and barley. Special K used to be marketed primarily as a low-fat cereal that can be eaten to help one lose weight. Following the 2023 spinoff of Kellogg's North American cereal division, the cereal is manufactured by WK Kellogg Co for the United States, Canada, and Caribbean markets. The former Kellogg's, renamed Kellanova, continues to manufacture the cereal for the rest of the world and the meal bars for all markets.

== Special K Challenge ==
The Special K brand previously advocated the "Special K Challenge." The goal of this challenge was to help an individual lose six pounds in two weeks; this loss was achieved by eating specific Special K products throughout the day. The diet began with a single serving of any Special K cereal, accompanied with 2/3 cup of skim milk and a side of fruit. The second meal of the diet included either a Special K Protein Meal Bar, Special K Protein Shake, or another serving of Special K cereal with 2/3 cup of skim milk and a side of fruit. The third meal of the day could be consumed normally, without any Special K restrictions. Throughout the day, an individual is allotted two Special K snacking times, eating any of the following specified snacks: Special K Protein Meal Bars, Special K Protein Shakes, Special K Breakfast Shakes, Special K Protein Granola Bars, Special K Crackers, Special K Cracker Chips, or Special K Popcorn. For any additional snack servings, an individual could consume fruits and vegetables. During the challenge, drinks could be consumed normally.

Critics of the Special K diet feel that it may leave dieters feeling hungry because of its limited food options and deter people from sticking to the diet. The diet has been criticised for being too low in protein, fiber, vegetables, and fruits. The diet does not include guidance on how to change unhealthy overeating or lack of exercise and their importance to maintaining weight loss.

== Nutrition ==
In the United States, Special K Original has 120 calories per 31g cup serving. One serving contains 0.5g fat, 23g carbohydrates, 4g sugar, and 6g protein. In the United Kingdom, Special K Original is 17% sugar, meaning a 30g serving contains 5g of sugar.

In the UK in 2014, an advertising campaign focused on a study run in collaboration with the Department of Human Sciences at Loughborough University, requiring overweight volunteer subjects to replace two meals a day with a bowl of the cereal, for a period of two weeks. At the conclusion of the study three-quarters of participants experienced fat loss.

== Varieties ==
In the US, Special K cereal is currently available in ten different varieties: Original, Chocolatey Delight, Chocolatey Strawberry, Cinnamon Pecan, Red Berries, Vanilla Almond, Fruit & Yogurt, Protein With Touch Of Cinnamon, Baked Cinnamon Crunch, and Blueberry. Pumpkin Spice is a seasonal flavor.

In the UK & Ireland, Special K cereal comes in ten different varieties: Original, Red Berries, Hazelnut & Almond, Milk Chocolate, Strawberry and Chocolate, Fruit & Nut, Creamy Berry Crunch, Peach & Apricot, and Yoghurty.

== Meal replacement ==
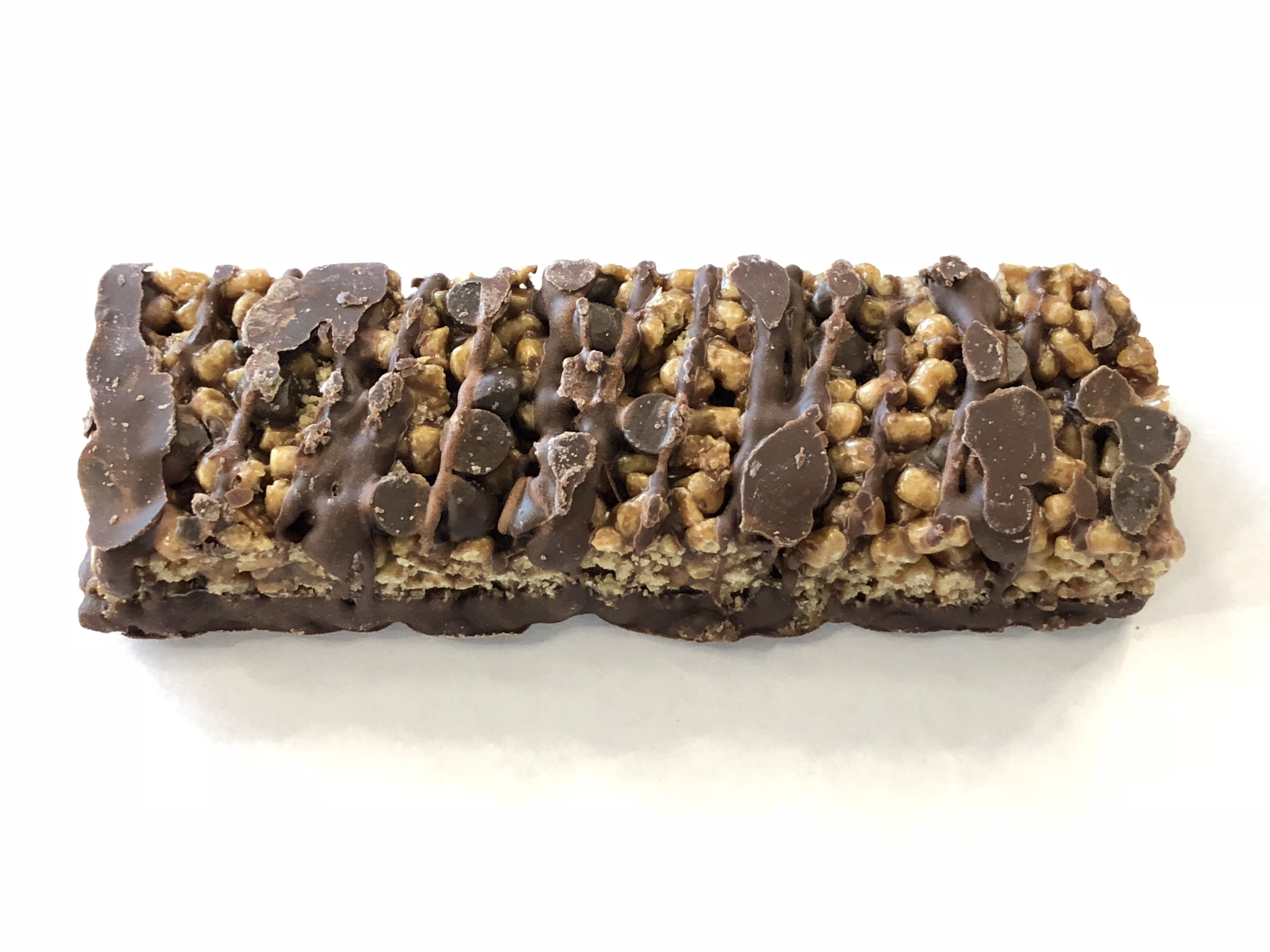
Special K meal bar

In the US, Special K currently produces four different varieties of protein bars, including Chocolate Peanut Butter, Strawberry, Brownie Batter, and Chocolatey Chip Cookie Dough.

== Snacks ==
Kellogg's Special K snacks were marketed as low fat alternatives to regular snacks. There were several varieties of Special K snacks, including Special K Protein Granola Bars, Special K Breakfast Shakes, Special K Cereal Bars, Special K CrackerChips, Special K Popcorn, and Special K Crackers.

There were four varieties of Special K Protein Bars: Chocolate Peanut Butter, Dark Chocolate, Greek Yogurt & Fruit, and Almond Honey Oat.

There were five varieties of Special K Breakfast Shakes: Chocolate Mocha Coffee House, Vanilla Cappuccino Coffee House, Chocolate Delight, Red Berries, and French Vanilla.

There were two varieties of Special K Cereal Bars: Red Berries and Chocolatey Pretzel.

There were five varieties of Special K Cracker Chips: Sea Salt, Cheddar, Sour Cream & Onion, Barbecue, and Salt & Vinegar.

There were two varieties of Special K Popcorn: Kettle Corn and White Cheddar.

There was one variety of Special K Crackers: Multi-grain.

All of these formerly available items have since been discontinued.

== Beverages ==
=== Special K_{2}O Protein Water ===
Special K protein water, launched in 2006 and then discontinued

Kellogg's Special K_{2}O Protein Water was a beverage released in September 2006 by the Kellogg Company. It was produced in several flavors and has been marketed as a weight-control and weight-loss product. The product was re-launched in 2007 by the Kellogg Company. The product is no longer available. Special K_{2}O Protein Water was available in several flavors, including Strawberry Kiwi, Lemon Twist, and Tropical Blend. Marketed as a low-calorie alternative protein drink, a 16-ounce bottle of K_{2}O contains 5 grams of protein, 10% DV of calcium, and 50 calories. The product has also been marketed as a weight-loss product, and has been marketed as part of "The Special K Challenge" and "Feeling good never looked better" advertising campaigns.

On August 15, 2007, Kellogg's re-launched Special K_{2}O Protein Water with enhanced graphics and a new flavor, Mixed Berry. In addition to the 5 grams of protein, the product was formulated with 5 grams of soluble fiber, from polydextrose, and 20% DV each of vitamins B_{3} (Niacin), B_{6}, and B_{12} while maintaining 50 calories. The product was also manufactured in a powdered form as a drink mix that is sold in packets, which is then added to water. The powdered product has 30 calories, 5 grams of fiber and 5 grams of protein per serving. The powdered mix has also been marketed as a weight-control product. It has since been discontinued.

=== Special K Protein Shakes ===
Kellogg's formerly produced Special K Protein Shakes. These were discontinued at an unknown period of time.

== Controversies ==
=== Canada ===
Until mid-2014, Kellogg's used a special Special K formula that was different in Canada from that used in the U.S. This formulation was similar to the original Special K introduced in the US in 1955. With the June 2014 closure of Kellogg's London, Ontario, plant, Canadians now eat Special K that is made in the U.S.

=== Denmark ===
Denmark has outlawed the addition of vitamins in Kellogg's products since 2004. Danish health officials banned cereals containing added vitamins because they claimed Kellogg's Special K wanted to add extremely high levels of vitamin B_{6}, calcium, folic acid, and iron, which would reach toxic levels when eaten on a daily basis. Young children risk liver and kidney damage while the fetuses of pregnant women could suffer complications.

=== The Netherlands ===
In an episode aired on October 15, 2009, the Dutch television show Keuringsdienst van Waarde investigated one of Kellogg's Special K nutritional claims, namely the addition of iron. The show provided evidence that the iron was not nutritional ionic iron—as it occurs in natural foods like spinach—but was, in fact, metallic iron. The nutritional experts in the show agreed that metallic iron should not be part of a diet. After the airing, the Dutch food authority nuanced the claims made in the TV program, claiming there are no health risks. They also challenged the claim that the cereal could contain "shredded bites", and responded that iron powder is suitable for human consumption.

=== United States ===
In late February 2013, the company recalled three sizes of the Special K Red Berries in the US which may have contained pieces of glass.
