= Crispix =

Breakfast cereal made by WK Kellogg Co

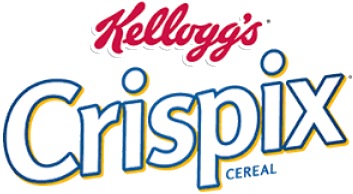

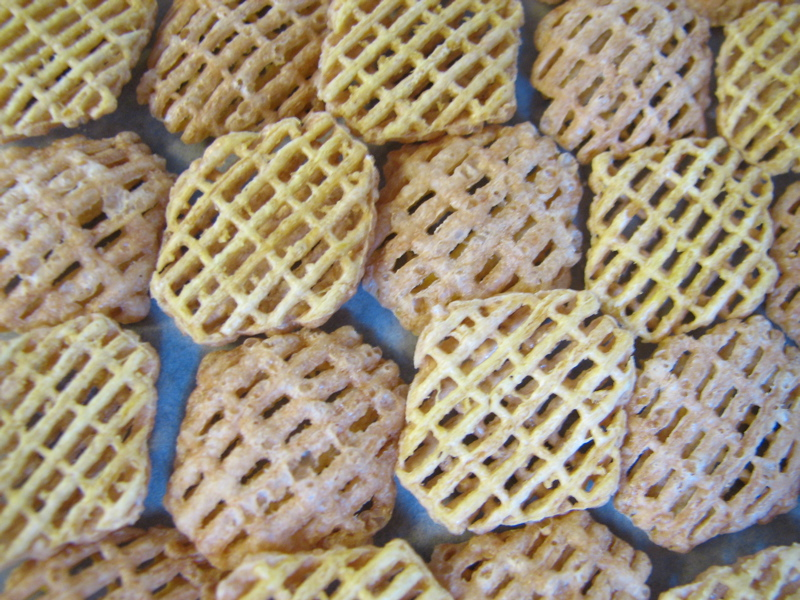
- Kellogg's Crispix – Hexagon Shaped Rice and Corn Cereal, closeup
- Product type: Breakfast cereal
- Current owner: WK Kellogg Co
- Country: United States
- Introduced: 1983; 43 years ago
- Previous owners: Kellogg Company (1983–2023)

Crispix is a brand of breakfast cereal, introduced by Kellogg's in 1983. It was created specifically to compete with Ralston Purina's Chex family of cereals, which had about $125 million in annual sales and no significant competition. By 1987, Crispix had sales of about $65 million.

Its box touts its unique composition of "Crispy rice on one side, crunchy corn on the other." The cereal itself is in a hexagon shape. The two sides are made in a lattice pattern and connected only at the edges; the center is open. Crispix is kosher/parve.

== Manufacturing process ==
Kellogg's has released limited information about manufacturing process that results in Crispix's unique puffed hexagon shape. According to Kellogg's, corn grits and rice are cooked separately, dried, and then rolled with a grooved roller creating a waffled appearance. The sheets of corn and rice are laid on top of each other, cut into hexagons and toasted in an oven that causes them to puff.

== Flavored versions ==
A variation of original Crispix introduced in late 2001 in the US known as Cinnamon Crunch Crispix was described by Kellogg's as a "[c]rispy corn and rice cereal with a cinnamon taste." Cinnamon Crunch Crispix joined a number of cereals discontinued by Kellogg's after disappointing sales.

Honey Flavored Crispix have been sold twice in the UK, and twice have been discontinued. In Australia, Crispix is rectangular, yellow and honey-flavored. A chocolate version is sold under the name Coco Pops Chex.

In some markets, Kellogg's owns the rights to the Chex name, and sells products in multiple flavors, including a green onion flavor in South Korea, the result of a marketing stunt in 2004 that asked for public input on the next flavor for the brand.

== Health ==
Crispix contains 3 g to 5 g of added sugars in some regions and 0 g of dietary fiber per serving. The cereal received one and a half stars out of five on the Australian Government's health star ratings.

== In popular culture ==
In 2019, on Logan Paul's Impaulsive podcast, Conservative Commentator Ben Shapiro stated Crispix as his favorite cereal.

"Double Dip Crunch" a quite similar cereal also made by Kelloggs was around in the 1990s. Kramer from the TV show Seinfeld throughout the show would mention "Double Crunch" in reference to that cereal.
