= Puffa Puffa Rice =

Breakfast cereal made by Kellogg's

Puffa Puffa Rice was a brand of breakfast cereal produced by the Kellogg Company. Somewhere between Puffed Wheat and Rice Krispies, the product was a form of puffed rice with a sweet, smooth texture and flavoured with brown sugar syrup.

== History ==
Puffa Puffa Rice was introduced in 1967 marketed with a Hawaiian theme and the product shown arriving on a surfboard. In 1972 the box was re-designed to feature a toy steam locomotive. In 1973 it changed again to feature popular puppet character Sooty waving a magician's wand over the cereal. In the US Puffa Puffa Rice was abruptly phased out during 1975.

== In popular culture ==
Puffa Puffa Rice figures prominently in Alan Ayckbourn's play Table Manners, which is part of his Norman Conquests.
