= Toucan Sam =

Breakfast cereal mascot

- Toucan Sam's appearance since 2021
- First appearance: 1963
- Created by: Manuel R. Vega
- Voiced by: Mel Blanc (1963–1970); Paul Frees (1970–1986); Maurice LaMarche (1986–2021); Matthew Curtis (2020); Colin Cassidy (2021–present)

In-universe information
- Species: Toucan
- Gender: Male
- Title: Mascot of Froot Loops

Toucan Sam is the cartoon toucan mascot for Froot Loops breakfast cereal. The character has been featured in advertising since 1963. He exhibits the ability to smell Froot Loops from great distances and invariably locates a concealed bowl of the cereal while intoning, "Follow your nose! It always knows!", sometimes followed by "The flavour of fruit! Wherever it grows!" Another version of this phrase in a string of commercials in the late 2000s presents the character at the end of the commercials saying "Just follow your nose!", followed by his nephews retorting, "For the fruity taste that shows!"

== History ==
Toucan Sam became the mascot for Froot Loops cereal in 1963. Manuel R. Vega created the cartoon character, who was originally voiced by Mel Blanc using an ordinary American accent. Blanc's original commercials were noted for their use of Pig Latin (referring to the cereal as OOT-fray OOPS-lay). The ad agency later decided to switch to the British accent more commonly associated with the character. They then employed Paul Frees to do what is, in effect, an imitation of Ronald Colman. After the death of Paul Frees, Toucan Sam's voice was performed by Maurice LaMarche (1986–2021), then Matthew Curtis for a single spot in 2020. In July 2021, Toucan Sam was re-designed and re-cast as a friendly and wise British accented voice - a role filled by voice actor Colin Cassidy.

Toucan Sam had a cousin named Arty Artin featured in a few commercials.

Animation of the commercials was created by several animation companies including Thumbnail Spots; this impacted the character growth over the years.

Although his nose originally had two pink stripes, during the 1970s it became a tradition that each stripe on his nose represented one of the colours of the pieces in the cereal. The additions of new colours have made this colour scheme no longer accurate. There are now six colours of this cereal. The first new colour was green, which was introduced in 1991, then purple in 1994, and blue in 1996.

The colours, perhaps, represent different flavours present in the cereal, but each colour has the same flavour.

== Maya Archaeology Initiative ==
The Maya Archaeology Initiative (MAI) is a project of the World Free Press Institute (WFPI). In June 2010, WFPI submitted a trademark application with the U.S. Patent and Trademark Office for the MAI logo, a profile of a toucan with a Mayan temple in the background, both encircled by yellow/green light. It was published on 15 March 2011.

Kellogg's (owner of the Toucan Sam logo) objected because the two logos are too similar. That caused a long argument, which ended on 15 November 2011 with an announcement that Kellogg's and the MAI were forming a charitable partnership.

== Recent commercials ==
Since 1994, Toucan Sam has been joined onscreen by his nephews Puey, Susey, and Louis, though they are never actually referred to by name. The nephews are voiced by two notable voiceover artists: Frank Welker and Jim Cummings. In recent commercials, Toucan Sam's three nephews have joined him in opposition to many practical Froot Loop-loving enemies through a series of integrated commercials (each of them as well as appropriately advertise the cereal itself).

The Toucan Sam campaign was produced by Pepper Films, Inc. until 2013 when Kellogg's transitioned the Froot Loops brand to CGI with animation company Nathan Love. Toucan Sam is currently voiced by Colin Cassidy.

In 2020, Toucan Sam was redesigned. Intended to be more simplistic and contemporary, the new design received negative reactions, with many detractors criticizing the human-like mouth as unrealistic. Due to the backlash, Toucan Sam was redesigned again in 2021, retaining his original look in a brighter blue with red, orange, green, and purple stripes on his nose, while having a more solid appearance instead of a feathery texture. During the redesign, a Froot Loops YouTube channel was created.

== Health concerns and legal status across countries ==
Toucan Sam, as well as other mascots featured in products targeted to children (such as Chester Cheetah and fellow Kellogg's mascot, Tony the Tiger), has been the subject of controversy in several countries. A study published in the journal Obesity Reviews, suggested familiar media character branding appeared to be "a powerful influence on children's preferences, choices and intake of less healthy foods." Sam and similar mascots, have been banned from being featured in packaging and advertising in countries like Chile, Peru, Argentina and Mexico. A study by a coalition that included Action on Sugar and Children's Food Campaign in the UK, found that 51% of 526 assessed "child-friendly" food and drink products with popular cartoon characters on their packaging were high in sugar, saturated fat, salt and fat, with only 18 healthy products such as fruit, vegetables and water were found to use child-friendly cartoons. Tom Watson of the Labour Party said using playful characters to appeal to children is “grossly irresponsible”, and the Health and Social Care Select Committee issued calls for a blanket ban on ‘brand-generated characters or licensed TV and film characters which are used to promote foods high in fat, sugar or salt." Consumption of sugar-sweetened drinks dropped 25 percent in the 18 months after Chile adopted these regulations, which also included octagon front-of-package warning labels and a ban on junk food in schools.

== See also ==
- List of breakfast cereal advertising characters
