= Raisin Wheats =

Breakfast cereal made by Kellogg's

- Product type: Breakfast cereal
- Current owner: Kellogg's
- Country: United Kingdom
- Website: kelloggs.co.uk/raisinwheats

Raisin Wheats (formerly Raisin Splitz, Raisin Wheatleys) is a Kellogg's breakfast cereal available in the United Kingdom, made from shredded wholegrain wheat and filled with raisin. The cereal is made in bite-sized pieces measuring 3/4in x 1in and is packaged in boxes weighing 0.5 kg.

== Ingredients ==
Its ingredients, as published on the Kellogg's web site 24 May 2006, are: Shredded Wholewheat, Raisins (23%), Glycerine, Niacin, Iron, Vitamin B_{6}, Riboflavin (B_{2}), Thiamin (B_{1}), Folic Acid, Vitamin B_{12}.

== Other versions ==
The cereal has been subsequently manufactured by numerous other suppliers under a generic brand, often in supermarkets' "own brand" range. In the United Kingdom, Tesco, Sainsbury's and Waitrose have all produced their own versions of the cereal.
