= Ricicles =

Breakfast cereal

Ricicles (stylised as RiCiCLES) was a breakfast cereal sold by Kellogg's in the United Kingdom and Ireland. It was similar to another Kellogg's product, Rice Krispies, with the addition of a frosted sugar coating. The product is known as Frosted Krispies in the United States.

Ricicles' mascot was the astronaut 'Captain Rik', who replaced Henry's Cat who replaced Tony Jr. in the 1980s, and Noddy in the 1960s.

As of January 2009 Ricicles were no longer included in Kellogg's variety packs, instead being replaced with a new product to test on customers.

In Mexico, a similar cereal called Rock N' Rice was sold in the mid-1990s.

On 30 November 2017, Kellogg's announced they would discontinue Ricicles as part of a drive to reduce sugar in children's cereals.
