= Apple Jacks =

Breakfast cereal made by WK Kellogg Co

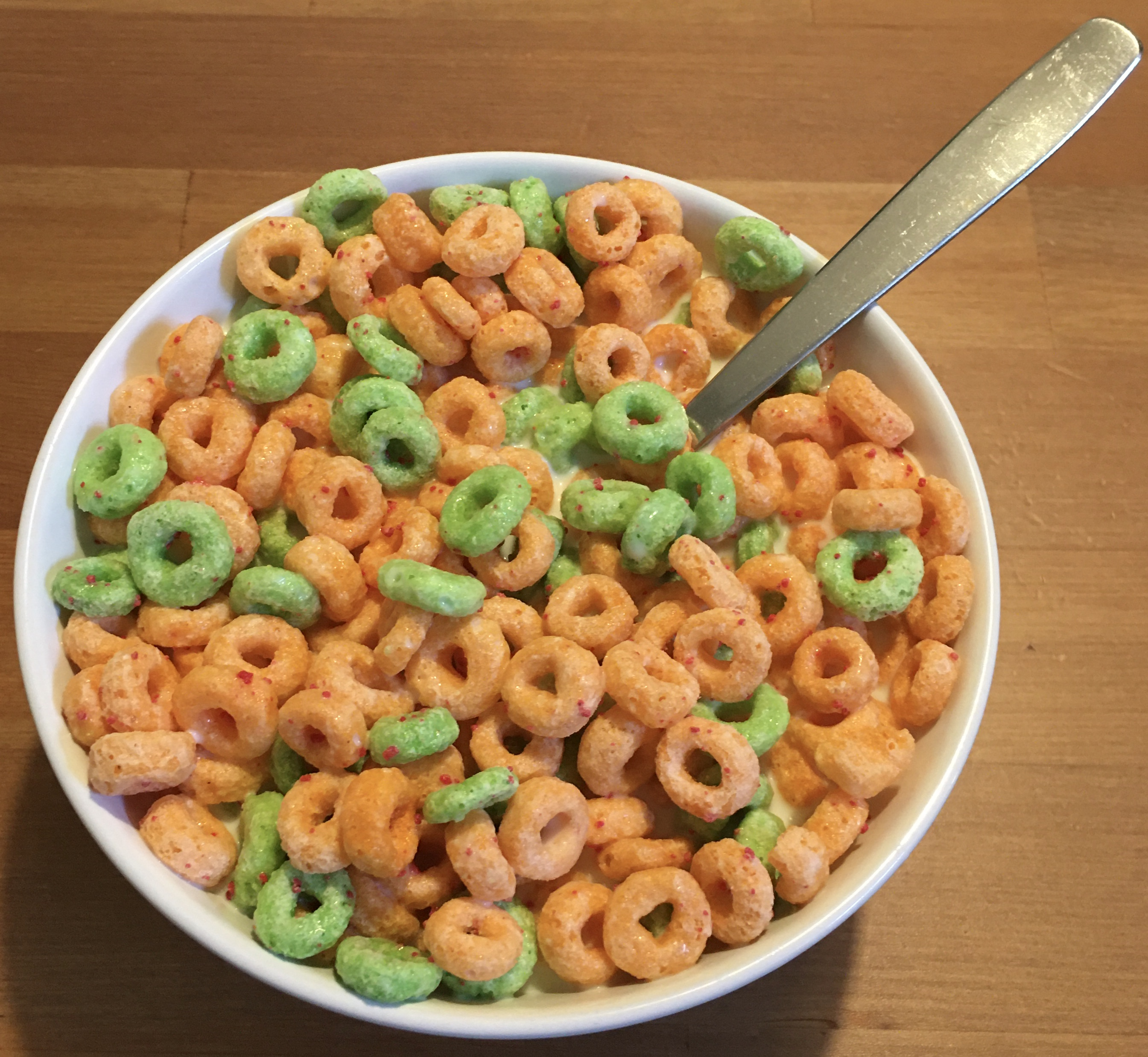
- Kellogg's Apple Jacks – Sweetened Cereal with Apple & Cinnamon, with milk
- Product type: Breakfast cereal
- Current owner: WK Kellogg Co (US, Canada, Caribbean); Kellanova (rest of world)
- Country: United States
- Introduced: 1965; 61 years ago
- Previous owners: Kellogg Company (1965–2024)
- Website: kelloggs.com/applejacks

Apple Jacks is an American brand of breakfast cereal that is produced by both successors to the original Kellogg's—WK Kellogg Co in the United States, Canada and the Caribbean markets and Kellanova in the rest of the world. It was introduced to the U.S. as "Apple O's" in 1965 after being invented by college intern William Thilly. In 1971 the name "Apple Jacks" was put into action by advertisers. The product is described by Kellogg's as a "crunchy, sweetened multi-grain cereal with apple and cinnamon." Apple Jacks is one of the top four cereal brands marketed within stores and is most heavily marketed on Kellogg's internet platform.

Originally, the Apple Jacks were only orange and O-shaped, until 1998 when the green O-shapes were added to the cereals. In a marketing promotion in December 2003, the green pieces changed their shape to X's for a few months. More recently, Apple Jacks has introduced New Apple Jacks "Crashers" – a unique cereal piece that replicates a mid-2007 advertising campaign when mascots Apple and CinnaMon were accidentally fused together. The latest (limited) edition, in 2010, are Apple Clones, with red pieces shaped like apples.

In 2001, Apple Jacks was brought to Canada in a Limited Edition box.

Apple Jacks were later released in Australia, alongside Kellogg's Australia's Apple Jacks LCMs, a puffed rice snack bar with marshmallow flavour and Apple Jacks flavoured sprinkles.

== Advertising ==
The first Apple Jacks mascot in the 1960s was "Apple Jack", a figure made from cutting a mouth onto an apple and applying a hat and pieces of cereal for eyes.

Television advertisements featuring Apple Jack had the tagline “A bowl a day keeps the bullies away!”, but was later altered to “A bowl a day gives you energy to play!”.

In the late 1960s the box depicted an "Apple Car" with pieces of cereal for wheels.

Around 1971, the official mascots became "The Apple Jacks Kids", a simplistically drawn animated boy and girl. The commercials featured the children singing and tumbling around all day. Their reign lasted for 21 years, making them the most well-known Apple Jacks mascots and most universally associated with the cereal in the public's memory. During this time, the Apple Jacks jingle became an integral part of the ad campaign: "A is for apple, J is for Jacks, Cinnamon-toasty Apple Jacks!" This campaign was retired in 1992.

Starting in 1992, there was an advertising campaign that featured children expressing their enjoyment of Apple Jacks, regardless of its lack of apple flavor. The slogan for this campaign became "We eat what we like". The shift toward marketing cereals directly at children signaled the growing recognition of children's influence on family purchases. The commercials took place in normal kid hang-outs, such as: at school, the garage, ballet class, and the kitchen, in the hall/hallway/door jamb, among others. In each commercial, a group of children are having Apple Jacks, when suddenly, some other people, such as adults or jealous kids, bash the group claiming it does not taste like apples and asks why they love it so much. The group then explains their love of the cereal usually by just saying, "We just do", and at the end of the commercial, would pose for a group Polaroid.

As of 2004, the marketing mascots were a carefree Jamaican cinnamon stick named CinnaMon and an accident-prone apple named Bad Apple. Labeled as Apple Jacks Adventures in print advertising, the commercials focused on CinnaMon upstaging Bad Apple by reaching a bowl of Apple Jacks before he can, in spite of the apple's attempts to stop him. Bad Apple's antagonistic nature was later dropped due to complaints from non-profit health food organizations such as Center for Science in the Public Interest over the campaign discouraging children from eating fruit by antagonizing the Apple character, leading to Apple and CinnaMon being portrayed as highly competitive friends, both getting into the bowl. The campaign was slated to be retired in 2007, and replaced by a retread of the 1990s campaign focused on children, but fan response to Apple and CinnaMon helped them remain as the mascots. In 2007, Apple and CinnaMon were fused together with CinnaMon sticking through the center of Apple with both of their legs at the bottom of their body. They remained this way for a few of the commercials until they became unstuck by a special machine.

== Nutrition ==
According to the label on the box, in 2010, each 28 gram serving had 100 calories, three grams of dietary fiber, and 12 grams of sugar.

== Cinnamon Jacks ==
In 2013, Kellogg's Apple Jacks introduced a new multi-grain cereal called "Cinnamon Jacks", with the cinnamon stick, CinnaMon, as its sole mascot. The cereal is flavored with brown sugar and cinnamon.

== See also ==
- List of breakfast cereals
