= Kashi (company) =

Food manufacturer

- Type: Subsidiary
- Genre: Breakfast cereals, snacks, entrées, waffles
- Founded: 1984; 42 years ago
- Founders: Philip Tauber; Gayle Tauber
- Headquarters: Solana Beach, California, United States
- Number of employees: 70
- Parent: Kellogg's (2000–2023); WK Kellogg Co (2023–present)
- Website: kashi.com

Kashi is a maker of whole grain cereals and other plant-based foods sourced from regular farming practices. Founded in La Jolla in 1984 by Phil and Gayle Tauber, the company became a subsidiary of Kellogg's in 2000, and produces about 100 products sold in the U.S. and Canada. Its original cereal, discontinued in 2021, was identified by the tagline "Seven Whole Grains on a Mission". The name "Kashi" is a blended term derived from "kashruth", meaning kosher or pure food, and "Kushi", the last name of the founder of American macrobiotics, Michio Kushi. The creators of the brand found meaning in the made-up-word as they explored nutrition from the needs of bodybuilders to those who were on macrobiotic diets.

== History ==
Kashi was a pioneering brand from the health food co-ops to mainstream markets with their nutrition-based simple ingredients. Phil and Gayle Tauber started the company from their home and ran it privately for over 18 years as a family business.

Kashi's acquisition by Kellogg's in 2000 allowed the parent company to enter the market for natural and organic foods.

In 2005, Kashi acquired Stretch Island Fruit Co, a producer of fruit strips and fruit chews. In 2008, Kashi acquired Bear Naked Granola, a producer of granola and bars. Both brands currently operate out of Kashi's headquarters in Solana Beach, California.

In 2007, Kashi acquired Bear Naked food company.

In April 2012, Kashi announced it would remove GMOs from all its existing GOLEAN cereals and Kashi Chewy Granola Bars by the end of 2014. It later announced all its products would be Non-GMO Project Verified by the summer of 2016.

When the Kellogg Company was split into two companies in October 2023, Kashi became a unit of WK Kellogg Co.

=== Location ===
Kellogg's moved Kashi's operations to Battle Creek, Michigan, in 2013, to consolidate with its other cereal brands. But after sales declines in 2014, the parent company moved the business back to southern California in Solana Beach to help it realign with the health food community. At that time, Kashi was established as a stand-alone natural food business and would continue to encompass the Bear Naked and Stretch Island Fruit Co. brands. A team, headed by CEO David Denholm, who led Kashi in the 2000s, is now running the company as a standalone business. Kashi remains one of the largest natural foods businesses in the United States and the world.

== Controversies ==
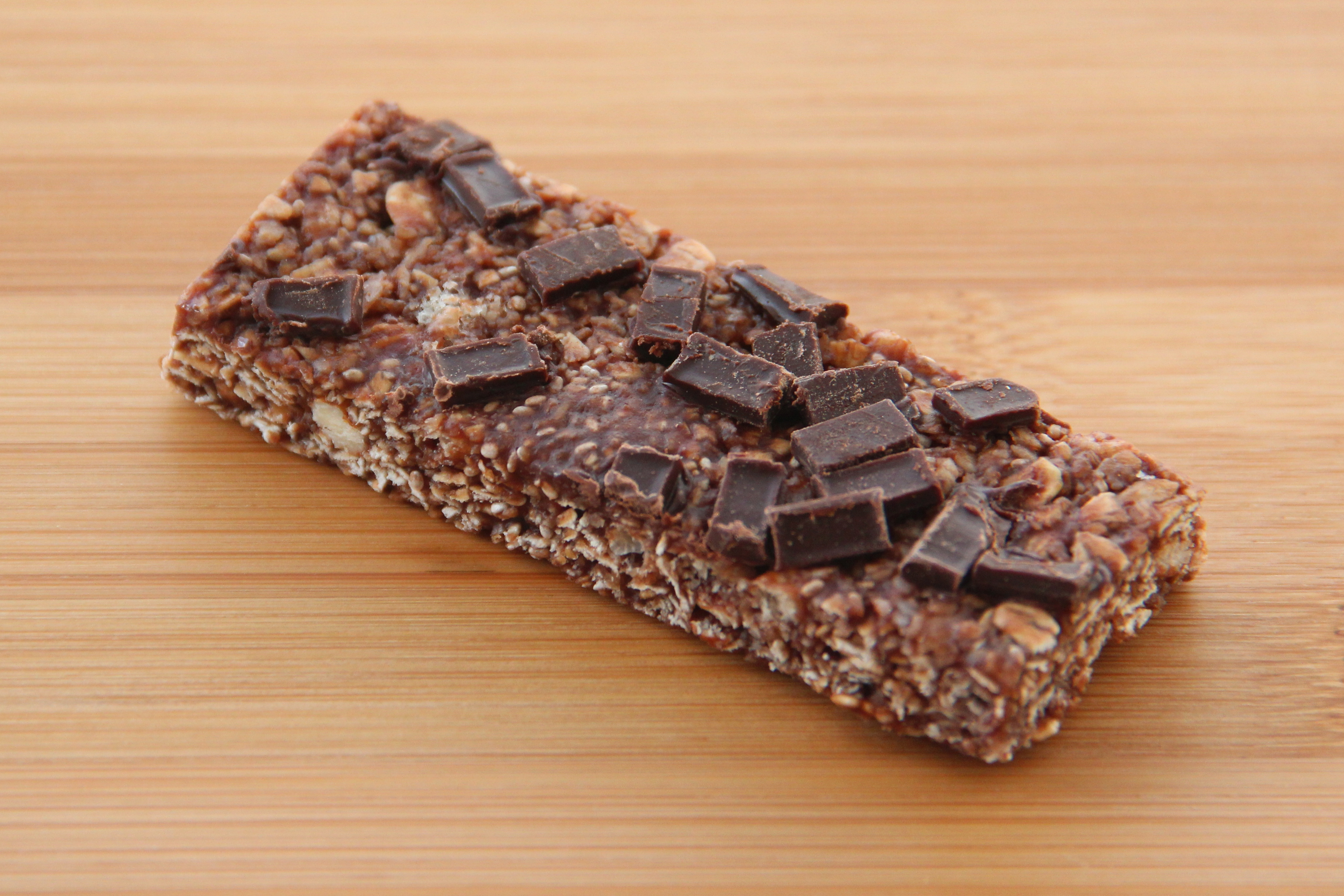
A Kashi Chocolate Almond Sea Salt granola bar

In April 2012, a grocer in Rhode Island found out Kashi used genetically engineered, non-organic ingredients, and pulled Kashi products from his store's shelves and later posted pictures and notification through social networking tools. Some customers began to call into question Kellogg's use of the term "natural" on Kashi product labels. Kashi's general manager responded by stating, "The FDA has chosen not to regulate the term 'natural'."

In 2012, the parent company of Kashi, the Kellogg Company, donated $790,000 to the NO on Prop. 37 campaign, which asked voters if they wanted foods containing genetically modified organisms to be labeled in California.

In 2013 it was reported that Kashi was being sued for claiming their products as "all natural" or "nothing artificial". The Court certified the following two Classes:

1) California "Nothing Artificial" Class: All California residents who purchased Kashi Company's food products on or after August 24, 2007 in the State of California that were labeled "Nothing Artificial" but which contained one or more of the following ingredients: Pyridoxine Hydrochloride, Alpha-Tocopherol Acetate and/or Hexane-Processed Soy ingredients. The Court excludes from the class anyone with a conflict of interest in this matter.

2) California "All Natural" Class: All California residents who purchased Kashi Company's food products on or after August 24, 2007 in the State of California that were labeled "All Natural" but which contained one or more of the following ingredients: Pyridoxine Hydrochloride, Calcium Pantothenate and/or Hexane-Processed Soy ingredients.
