= Start (cereal) =

Breakfast cereal made by Kellogg's

Start (Multi-Grain Start) was a breakfast cereal which was produced by Kellogg's in the UK from the mid-1980s until 2018. Start was promoted as a cereal designed for improving sports performance. It was made from wheat, corn and oats and a single bowlful was said to provide a third of a human's daily vitamin RDA. It was suitable for vegetarians but not for wheat allergy sufferers.

== Product details ==
Vitamins and minerals:

- Carbohydrates – starch (53 g), sugar (69 g)
- Fat – 3.5 g (saturates 2 g)
- Fibre – 5 g
- Sodium – 0.4 g
- Vitamin B_{6} – 1.3 mg
- Vitamin B_{12} – 0.63 μg
- Vitamin D – 3.2 μg
- Folic acid – 250 μg
- Thiamin B_{1} – 0.9 mg
- Riboflavin B_{2} – 1.0 mg
- Niacin – 11.3 mg
- Iron – 8.8 mg

== Advertising ==
The cereal had a number of different advertising campaigns, with its most notable promoter being British athlete Steve Cram in the mid-1980s, with the slogan "I Want, Now I Can". Several also featured British Tour de France rider Robert Millar.
