= Kellogg's Cereal City USA =

Defunct tourist attraction in Michigan

Kellogg's Cereal City USA was a tourist attraction in downtown Battle Creek, Michigan (itself nicknamed "Cereal City"), open between 1998 and 2007. It aimed to tell visitors the story of the Kellogg's brand, its products and contribution to the breakfast cereal industry in particular.

== Opening and features ==
Interest in a Kellogg's-themed attraction grew after the company ceased conducting tours at its nearby production facility in 1986. The roadside attraction broke ground on December 19, 1996. Billed as a museum and designed to look like a turn-of-the-20th-century industrial factory, the attraction was opened at 171 West Michigan Avenue in May 1998. It cost the Heritage Center Foundation $22 million to build and outfit. Entry cost $7.95.

The attraction's opening was enthusiastically welcomed by then-Michigan Governor, John Engler and was described as a "major tourist attraction" to which the "State of Michigan contributed approximately $2.8 million".

The 45,000-square-foot (4,200 m^{2}) two-story space featured a range of exhibits with information about the company, its history, and its products. It also included a restaurant, the Red Onion Grill, modelled on and named after the original diner at the Battle Creek Sanitarium. There was also an ice cream parlor named Sullivan's where guests would get ice cream sundaes topped with Kellogg cereals.

== Visitor numbers and closure ==
The venture's original proponents claimed the attraction would attract more than 400,000 visitors each year. In actuality, visitor numbers peaked in 1998 (the year it opened) at 162,000 guests. From 2000 to 2005, it attracted an average of 86,203 visitors each year. In 2006, it had only 75,500 visitors and it closed in January 2007. According to operators, it needed at least 100,000 annual visitors to remain financially viable. The city of Battle Creek was "left with an $875,000 bill for the closed attraction" but Kellogg's itself bought the building for $2 million, wiped the debt, converted it into commercial office space and sold it the following year.

In 2011, the building was donated to Battle Creek Public Schools.

== See also ==
- Will Keith Kellogg
