= Raisin bran =

Breakfast cereal containing raisins and bran flakes

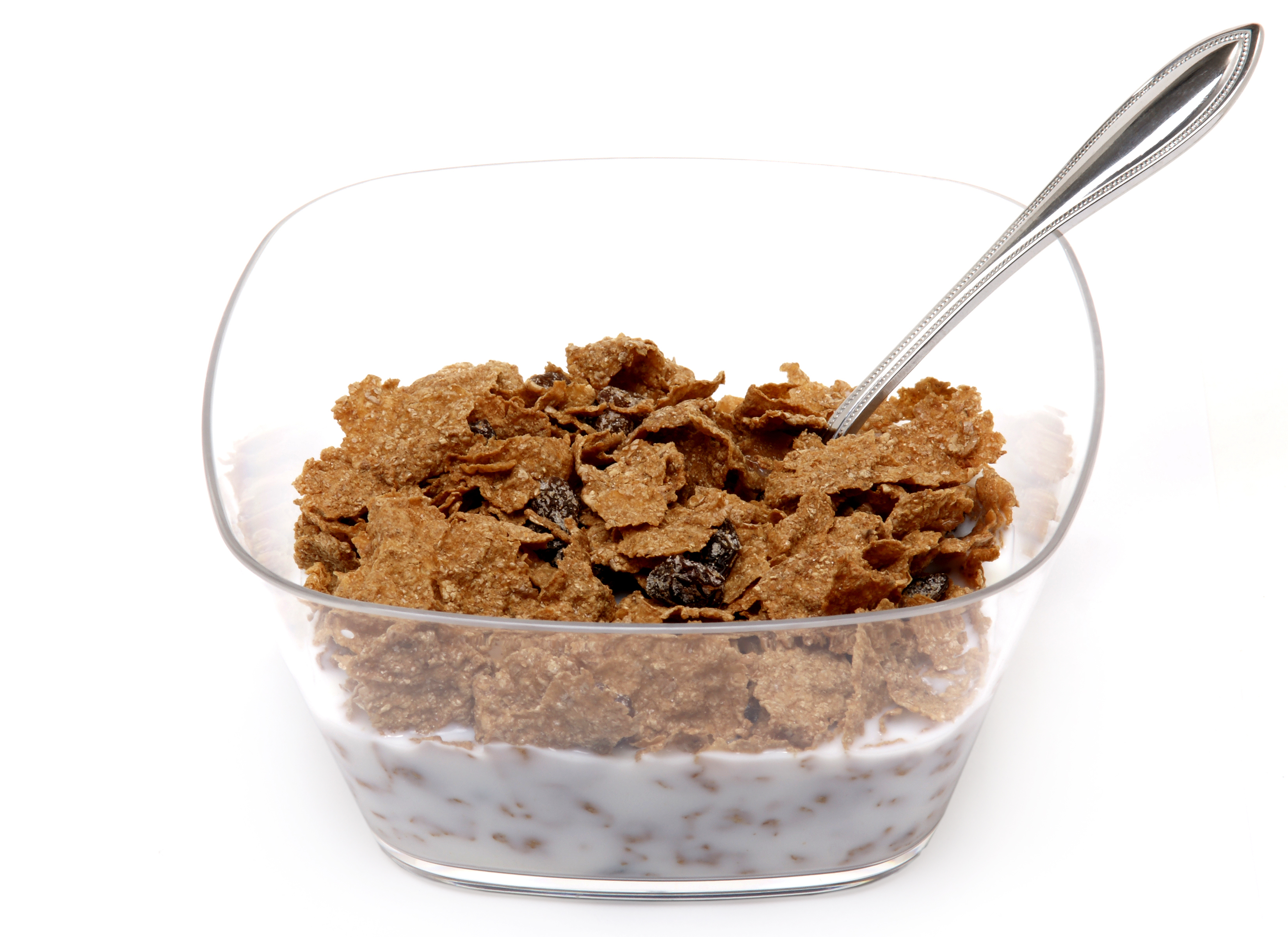
- Raisin bran cereal with milk
- Alternative names: Sultana bran
- Type: Breakfast cereal
- Place of origin: United States
- Created by: Skinner Manufacturing Company
- Invented: 1926
- Main ingredients: Wheat, raisins, wheat bran, sugar, brown sugar syrup (Kellogg's, US)
- Ingredients generally used: malt flavour, salt (Kellogs, US)
- Variations: Sultana bran

Raisin bran (sultana bran in some countries) is a breakfast cereal containing raisins and bran flakes. Raisin bran is manufactured by several companies under a variety of brand names, including the popularly known Kellogg's Two Scoops Raisin Bran, General Mills' Total Raisin Bran, and Post Cereals' Raisin Bran. Though Raisin Bran is generally perceived as a healthier alternative to more sugary cereals, most popular brands of raisin bran contain high amounts of sugar.

== History ==
Skinner's Raisin-BRAN was the first raisin bran brand on the market, introduced in the United States in 1926 by the Skinner Manufacturing Company. For 17 years, Skinner had ownership over the product's name, until Kellogg's and Post began to sell their own versions of raisin bran. With concerns of losing money within grocery store sales, Skinner filed a cease-and-desist in an attempt to keep ownership over his raisin bran product.

The name "Raisin-BRAN" was at one time trademarked by Skinner, however in 1944 the U.S. Court of Appeals for the Eighth Circuit found:

The name "Raisin-BRAN" could not be appropriated as a trade-mark, because: "A name which is merely descriptive of the ingredients, qualities or characteristics of an article of trade cannot be appropriated as a trademark and the exclusive use of it afforded legal protection. The use of a similar name by another to truthfully describe his own product does not constitute a legal or moral wrong, even if its effect be to cause the public to mistake the origin or ownership of the product.

Now, any brand or manufacturer may create their own version of raisin bran and name it just that.

== Ingredients ==
Ingredients vary from producer to producer, market to market and over time.

In 2020, Kellogg's raisin bran in the United States contains the following ingredients: whole grain wheat, raisins, wheat bran, sugar, brown sugar syrup, malt flavor, salt, and assorted vitamins and minerals. The cereal's vitamin D3 supplementation is made from lanolin, which is an animal product, rendering it as a non-vegan breakfast cereal.

== Health ==
Raisin bran cereal is commonly referred to as a "healthy" breakfast cereal because of its high fiber content, but according to Consumer Reports, Kellogg's Raisin Bran, for example, has a low nutrition rating.

In 1991, Kellogg's complained that the guidelines for the USDA's supplemental assistance WIC program did not allow for the purchase of Kellogg's Raisin Bran for containing too much sugar. Currently, with 17 grams of sugar per cup, it has a higher content of sugar than Lucky Charms, Reese's Puffs, and Cocoa Krispies (all known to be "sugary" cereals).

A serving of Kellogg's Raisin Bran provides 80% of the Daily Value of manganese and 6% of the Daily Value of potassium, both important nutrients for the body.

Research suggests that eating commercially produced raisin bran containing sugared raisins produces acid which can lead to cavities, while home-made raisin bran, created by adding plain, unsugared raisins to bran flakes, produces less of this acid.

While Kellogg's sultana bran received 4.5 stars out of 5 on the Australian Government's Health Star Rating System, sugar is the fourth largest ingredient after wheat, sultanas and wheat bran.

Kellogg's Raisin Bran logo

Post Raisin Bran logo

== Manufacturers ==
Other smaller manufacturers exist worldwide.

- Kellogg's – Split into the following two companies in 2023:
  - Kellanova – While consisting mostly of the snack food business of the original Kellogg's, it continues to manufacture and sell cereals, including raisin bran, outside North America.
  - WK Kellogg Co – The North American cereal division of the original Kellogg's, operating in the United States, Canada, and the Caribbean.
- Post Consumer Brands
- General Mills

== See also ==
- Muesli – Breakfast dish based on raw rolled oats
