= Cracklin' Oat Bran =

Breakfast cereal made by Kellogg's

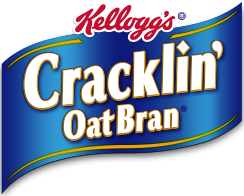

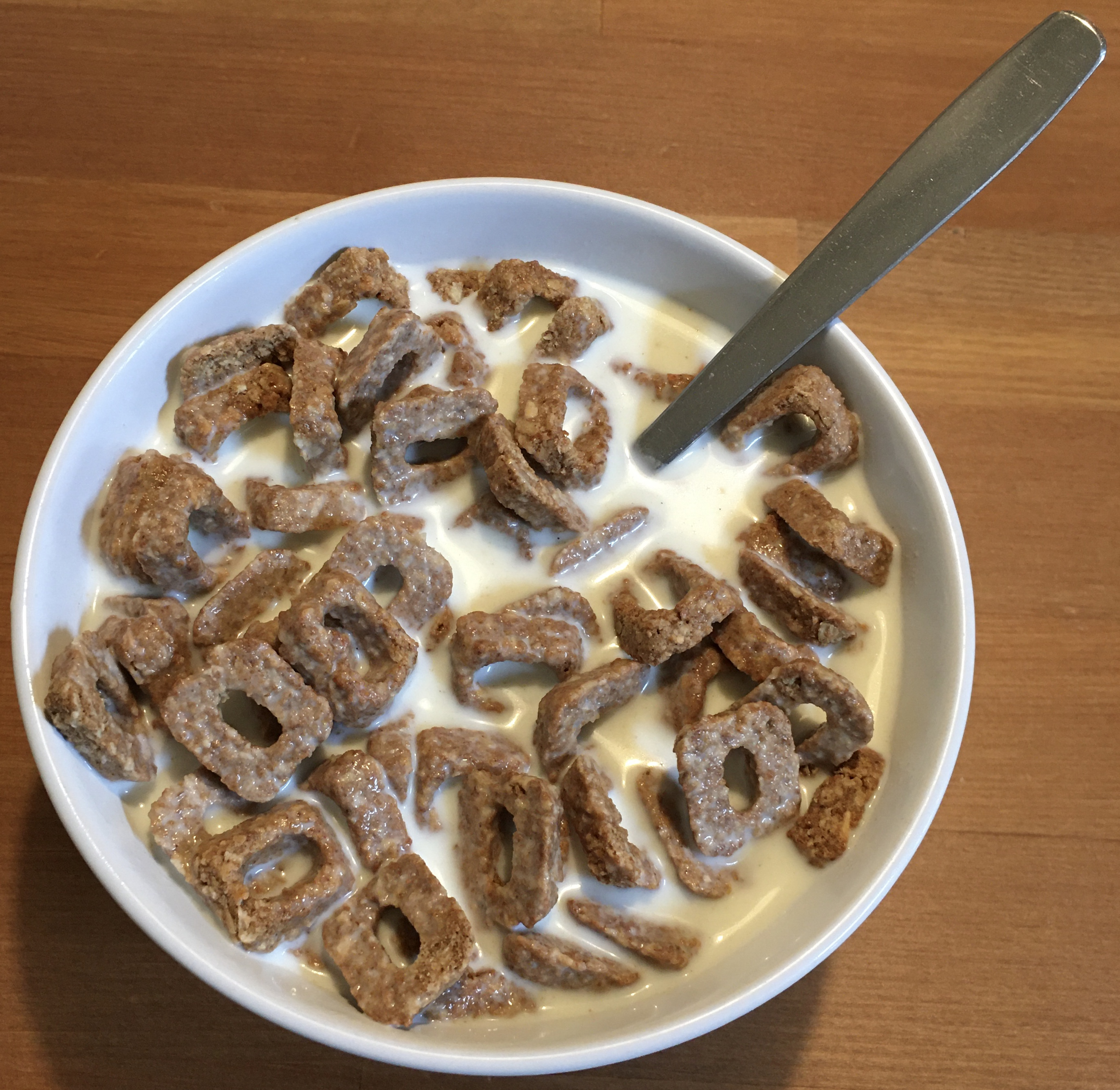
- Kellogg's Cracklin' Oat Bran – Crunchy, Sweet, Oven-Baked Oat Cereal, with milk
- Product type: Breakfast cereal
- Current owner: Kellogg's
- Country: U.S.
- Introduced: 1977; 49 years ago
- Website: kelloggs.com/cracklinoatbran

Cracklin' Oat Bran is a breakfast cereal made by Kellogg's, introduced in 1977. The cereal is made of oat bran flavored with cinnamon and nutmeg and is held together by brown sugar in a rectangular shape. The cereal is a source of dietary fiber, as one of the main ingredients is whole oats, but it contains a significant amount of sugar and saturated fat. The palm oil used in the cereal is modified slightly to suggest more of a sugary flavor than normal palm oil.

The recipe for Cracklin' Oat Bran underwent a major change in 1989, when consumer health advocates pushed for Kellogg's to remove coconut oil, which is 92% saturated fat, from the cereal. A second recipe alteration occurred in the late 2010s after Kellogg changed the source of its toasted bran ingredient and removed artificial colors and flavors from the product. The change prompted complaints and petitions calling for a return to the previous recipe.

In the early 2000s, Cracklin’ Oat Bran developed a reputation as a durable “set staple” in the Los Angeles entertainment production industry, favored by entertainers including Jennifer Aniston, Vince Vaughn, Justin Timberlake, Will Ferrell, and Prince.

One serving of Cracklin' Oat Bran (without milk) contains 41 grams of carbohydrates, 16 grams of sugar, 7 grams of dietary fiber, 4 grams of protein, 3.5 grams of saturated fat, 0 grams of trans fat, and 230 calories.
