= List of breakfast cereal advertising characters =

This is a list of breakfast cereal advertising characters.

== Cereal Partners Worldwide ==
- Klondike Pete

== Force Food Company ==
- Sunny Jim

== General Mills ==
Character	Product	Years used	Notes
Boo Berry	Boo Berry cereal	1972–present	
Buzz the bee	Honey Nut Cheerios cereal		originally voiced by Arnold Stang
Carmella Creeper	Carmella Creeper cereal	2016–present	
Cookie Jarvis	Cookie Crisp cereal	1977–1985	
Cookie Crook	Cookie Crisp cereal	1981–1997	
Cookie Cop	Cookie Crisp cereal	1985–1997	
Chip the Dog	Cookie Crisp cereal	1991–2005	
Chip the Wolf	Cookie Crisp cereal	2005–present	
Count Alfred Chocula	Count Chocula cereal	1971–present	
Wendell, the Cinnamon Toast Crunch chef	Cinnamon Toast Crunch cereal	1984–2009	
Crazy Squares	Cinnamon Toast Crunch cereal	2009–present	
Franken Berry	Franken Berry cereal	1971–present	
Fruit Brute	Fruit Brute cereal	1974–1982	

- Cluster Squirrel
- Fillmore Bear
- Hoppity Hooper

Character	Product	Years used	Notes
Lucky the Leprechaun	Lucky Charms cereal	1964–present	originally voiced by Arthur Anderson and presently voiced by Tex Brashear
Major Jet			
Maxwell Masher			
Pac-Man			
Professor Waldo Wigglesworth			
Rocky and Bullwinkle	Jets cereal		
Sonny the Cuckoo Bird	Cocoa Puffs cereal	1960s–present	originally voiced by Chuck McCann
Strawberry Shortcake cereal			
Trix rabbit	Trix cereal	1959–present	originally voiced by Mort Marshall; lately has been done by Russell Horton
Yummy Mummy	Fruity Yummy Mummy cereal	1988–1992	

== Kellogg Company ==
Character	Product	Years used	Notes
Big Yella			
Bigg Mixx			
Captain Rik	Ricicles cereal		
Cinnamon & Apple	Kellogg's Apple Jacks cereal	mid-2000s–present	
Coco the Monkey	Coco Pops		
Chocos the Bear	Chocos		
Cornelius the rooster	Corn Flakes cereal		originally voiced by Dallas McKennon, voiced in 1960s by Andy Devine
Crunchosaurus Rex			
Cliffy the Clown	Kellogg's Honey Smacks cereal	1953–1956	
Smaxey the Seal	Kellogg's Honey Smacks cereal	1957–1961	
Quick Draw McGraw	Kellogg's Honey Smacks cereal	1961–1965	
The Smackin' Bandit	Kellogg's Honey Smacks cereal	1965	half-mule half-kangaroo who kissed everyone in sight
The Smackin' Brothers	Kellogg's Honey Smacks cereal	1966–early 1970s	two boys dressed in boxing shorts and boxing gloves
Indian Chief	Kellogg's Honey Smacks cereal	early 1970s	
Dig 'Em Frog	Kellogg's Honey Smacks cereal	1972–1986, 1987–present	originally voiced by Howard Morris and later by Tex Brashear
Love Smack's	Kellogg's Honey Smacks cereal	1982	a heart-shaped dog who hugged children
Wally the Bear	Kellogg's Honey Smacks cereal	1986–1987	
Donald Duck			
Loopy Bee	Honey Loops		
Mickey Mouse			
Milton the Toaster	Pop Tats Crunch		
OJ Joe			
Pokémon			
Snap, Crackle and Pop	Kellogg's Rice Krispies cereal	1928–present	
Sugar Pops Pete	Kellogg's Sugar Pops cereal	1950s	
Sammy the Seal			
Sunny the sun	Kellogg's Raisin Bran cereal	1966–present	originally voiced by Daws Butler and later by Tex Brashear
Tinkerbell			
Toucan Sam	Kellogg's Froot Loops cereal	1952–present	voiced by Mel Blanc, Paul Frees, Maurice LaMarche
Puey, Susey, Louis	Kellogg's Froot Loops cereal	1994–present	Toucan Sam's nephews
Tony the Tiger	Kellogg's Frosted Flakes cereal	1951–present	voiced by Dallas McKennon, Thurl Ravenscroft, Lee Marshall and now Tex Brashear
Woody Woodpecker			
Who, the Wizard of Oatz			
Yogi Bear			
Zimmys Cinnamon Stars			

== Nestlé ==
Character	Product	Years used	Notes
Lion	Lion Cereal		
Pico	Chocapic cereal		
Quicky the Nesquik Bunny	Nesquik cereal		
Snow			
Captain Star			
Zuco Bear	Nestlé Snow Flakes cereal		

== Post Cereals ==
Character	Product	Years used	Notes
Loveable Truly	Alpha-Bits cereal	1964–early 1970s	postman (voiced by Jim Nabors)
Alpha-Bits Wizard	Alpha-Bits cereal	1970s–1980s	
Alfie the Alpha-Bits Cereal Wonder Dog	Alpha-Bits cereal	1980s	
Alpha	Alpha-Bits cereal	2000s–2021	computer who makes Alpha-Bits
Alpha Pig; Princess Presto; Super Why; Woofster; Wonder Red	Alpha-Bits cereal	2012–2021	CGI-animated child stars of Super Why! from PBS
Kids	Alpha-Bits cereal	1970s–1990s	
Alphabet letters	Alpha-Bits cereal	1990s–early 2000s	Animated letters who are in cereal
The Flintstones characters	Cocoa and Fruity Pebbles cereal	1970–present	
Mr. Hunger	Shreddies cereal	1995–2001	
Honeycomb Kid	Post Cereals' Honeycomb cereal	1960s (Cowboy) 1980s (Kid)	
The Crazy Craving	Post Cereals' Honeycomb cereal	debuted 1990s	
Bernard, the Bee Boy	Post Cereals' Honeycomb cereal	2010	
Linus the Lionhearted	Post Cereals' Heart of Oats cereal	1959–1960s	voiced by Sheldon Leonard
Linus the Lionhearted	Post Cereals' Crispy Critters cereal	1963–1969	
Orange Moose	Post Cereals' Crispy Critters cereal	1962–1963	voiced by Alfie Scopp
Crispy	Post Cereals' Crispy Critters cereal	1987	voiced by Rich Little
Sugar Bear	Post Cereals' Golden Crisp cereal	1949–present	voiced by Sterling Holloway, Gerry Matthews

== Quaker Oats Company ==
Character	Product	Years used	Notes
Cap'n Crunch	Cap'n Crunch cereal	1963–present	created by Jay Ward Productions; originally voiced by Daws Butler
Jean LaFoote	Cap'n Crunch cereal	1966–present	played by Bill Scott, Adam Shapiro, Joe Nipote, Isaac Robinson-Smith
Honey Monster	Sugar Puffs cereal	1957–present	created by Jay Ward Productions, voiced by William Conrad
Jeremy	Sugar Puffs cereal	1966	played by herself.
King Vitaman	King Vitaman cereal	1968–2019	created by Jay Ward Productions, voiced by Joe Flynn
Little Mikey	Life cereal	1972–1981	played by John Gilchrist
Quake	Quaker Quake cereal	1965–1970s	created by Jay Ward Productions, voiced by William Conrad
Quisp	Quaker Quisp cereal	1965–1970s	voiced by Daws Butler

== Ralston Purina ==
- The Freakies

== Weetabix Food Company ==
- Professor Weeto
- The Weetabix Gang

== See also ==
- List of breakfast cereals
