= Honey Smacks =

Breakfast cereal made by Kellogg's

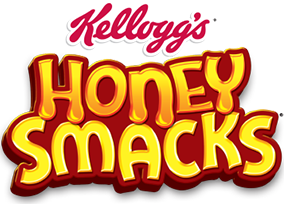

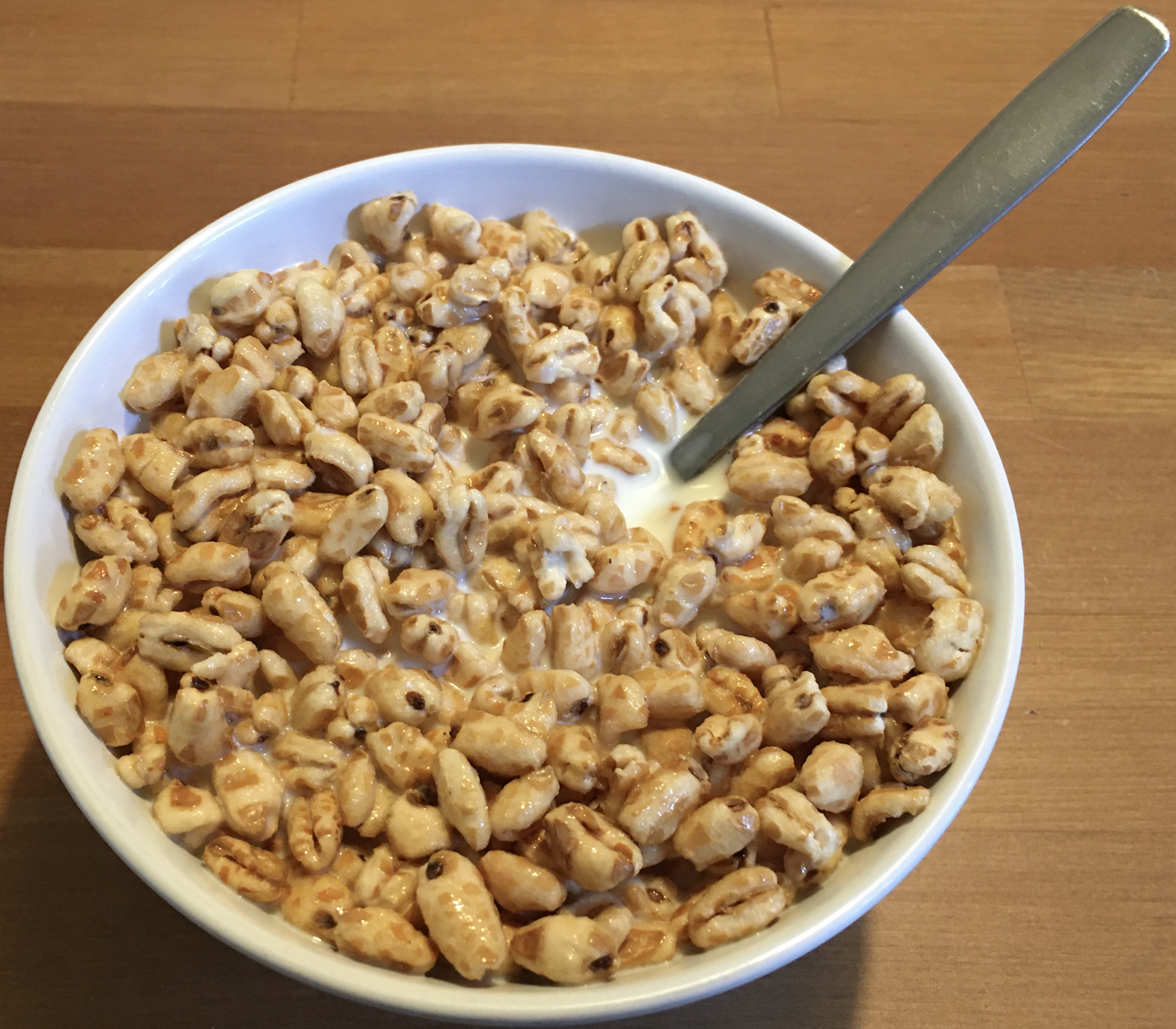
- Kellogg's Honey Smacks – Sweetened Puffed Wheat Cereal with milk
- Product type: Breakfast cereal
- Current owner: WK Kellogg Co
- Country: United States
- Introduced: 1953; 73 years ago
- Previous owners: Kellogg's
- Website: kelloggs.com/honeysmacks

Honey Smacks (formerly known as Sugar Smacks, known simply as Smacks in some international markets) is a sweetened puffed wheat breakfast cereal made by Kellogg's, noted for its high sugar content. It was introduced in the early 1950s.

== Naming ==
Introduced in 1953, the cereal has undergone several name changes, starting out as "Sugar Smacks". By 1981, it was renamed "Honey Smacks" in order to downplay its sugar content, even though the sugar content stayed the same. In the 1980s, the word "Honey" was dropped from the name and the product was then simply called "Smacks". That name is still used in Germany, Spain, Belgium, the Netherlands, Finland and France. However, in the US the name reverted to "Honey Smacks" in 2004.

In the UK in 1957, a similar product called Sugar Puffs debuted.

In Norway it is known as "Honni Korn Smacks".

In Australia, the cereal had been known as Honey Smacks since the 1970s. However, Kellogg's Australia no longer markets the brand.

On August 18, 2025, the cereal was released under the name Smacks in the United Kingdom.

== Sugar content ==
Kellogg's Honey Smacks
Nutritional value per 100 g (3.5 oz)
- Energy: 370 kcal (1,500 kJ)
- Carbohydrates: 89 g
- Sugars: 56 g
- Dietary fiber: 4 g
- Fat: 2 g
- Protein: 7 g
- ^{†}Percentages estimated using US recommendations for adults.

Presweetened breakfast cereals first appeared in 1939. At the time of its introduction in the early 1950s, Sugar Smacks had the highest sugar content in the US cereal market (56% per weight), surpassing Sugar Crisp (later renamed "Golden Crisp") by competitor Post Cereal which had debuted with what The Oxford Companion to Sugar and Sweets would later call "an astonishing sugar content of 51 percent". (The cereals are both sweetened puffed wheat.)

In a 2008 comparison of the nutritional value of 27 cereals, US magazine Consumer Reports found that both Honey Smacks and the similar Golden Crisp were still the two brands with the highest sugar content, more than 50 percent (by weight), commenting "There is at least as much sugar in a serving of Kellogg's Honey Smacks [...] as there is in a glazed doughnut from Dunkin' Donuts". Consumer Reports recommended parents choose cereal brands with better nutrition ratings for their children.

The product title Honey Smacks is incongruous, if not misrepresentative, since honey is actually a minor ingredient in the recipe. The ingredient label indicates that sugar and dextrose are at least two-thirds of the sugar ingredients by weight. Conversely, the proportion of honey in the recipe could range from trace amounts to one-third.

== 2018 recall ==
Kellogg's announced a voluntary recall of certain Honey Smacks packages on June 14, 2018, due to the possible presence of salmonella. Although the recall included only packages with a specific range of expiration dates, the Centers for Disease Control and Prevention later advised consumers to avoid eating the cereal entirely. The cereal returned to the shelves in November of that year.

== Marketing history ==
Since the cereal was introduced in 1953, there have been various different mascots.

=== United States ===
Cliffy the Clown

Various clowns served as the advertising mascot from 1953 to 1956, including Cliffy the Clown and Lou Jacobs from the Ringling Brothers and Barnum and Bailey Circus. Ads with these clowns were known for showing them doing the "Sugar Smack Swing".

Smaxey the Seal

In 1957, a sailor-suit-wearing seal named Smaxey became the mascot.

Quick Draw McGraw

The Hanna-Barbera cartoon horse sheriff, Quick Draw McGraw, took over in 1961.

The Smackin' Brothers

In 1966, the Smackin' Brothers, two cartoon boys who loved to roughhouse, became the new mascots. These ads usually featured the brothers wanting Sugar Smacks but winding up smacking each other instead. Also during 1966, promotional box designs were briefly introduced featuring characters from Star Trek. Later commercials were similar to most Cheerios commercials as they demonstrated how the cereal was "vitamin-powered". Paul Frees narrated these ads.

Dig'em Frog

In the early 1970s, an Indian Chief appeared briefly, replaced by Dig'em Frog in 1972. He continued as the mascot when the cereal was rechristened Honey Smacks in the early 1980s. In these ads, Dig'em would appear in front of a group of kids, and they would eat some cereal together.

Wally the Bear

Dig 'em was replaced by an animal more associated with honey, Wally the Bear, in 1986 (1984 in France). These ads featured Wally (not to be confused with the Wally Bear from Wally Bear and the NO! Gang) pestering a kid eating a bowl of Honey Smacks and doing anything to get some, and the kid would always refuse or just ignore Wally completely. Animated by Kurtz & Friends, these commercials performed poorly since they seemed too much like the Trix commercials, and Dig'em Frog was brought back the following year by popular demand.

Dig'em Frog (redux)

During the 1990s, advertising campaigns for the cereal featured Dig'em attempting to have a bowl of Smacks while trying to outsmart his nemesis, Kitty. Dig'em's voice was provided by Len Dresslar and later Frank Welker.

== Similar products ==
- Post's Golden Crisp
- Sanitarium's Honey Puffs
- Quaker's Sugar Puffs
- Malt-O-Meal's Golden Puffs
- Aldi stores sell a similar product called Honey Wheat Puffs manufactured under the Millville brand.
