= Kix (cereal) =

Breakfast cereal made by General Mills

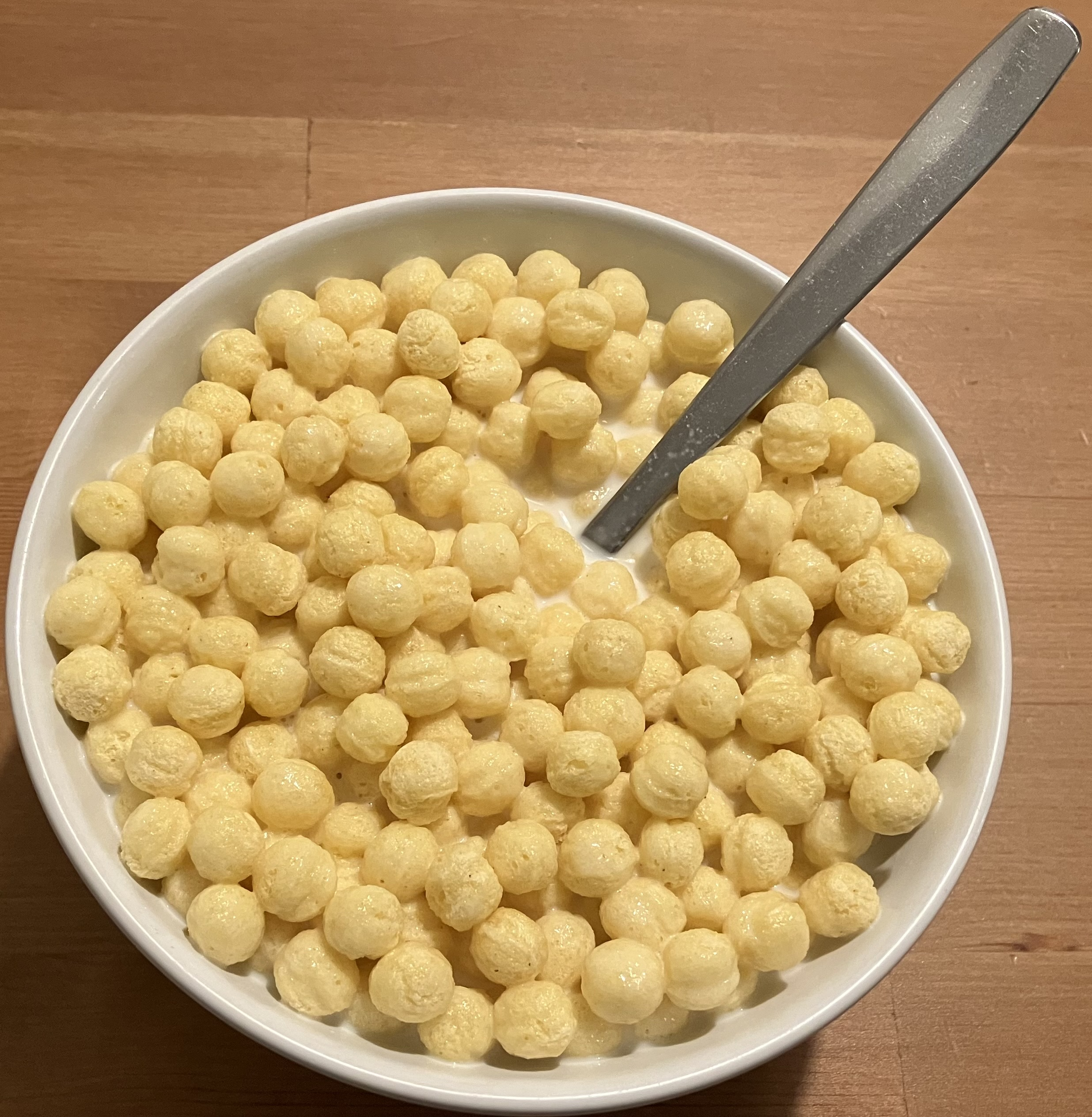
- General Mills – Kix cereal – Crispy Corn Puffs, with milk
- Current owner: General Mills
- Country: United States
- Introduced: 1937; 89 years ago
- Tagline: "Kid-tested. Parent-approved"
- Website: www.kixcereal.com

Kix (stylized as KiX) is an American brand of breakfast cereal introduced in 1937 by the General Mills company of Golden Valley, Minnesota. The product is an extruded, expanded puffed-grain cereal made with cornmeal.

== Products ==
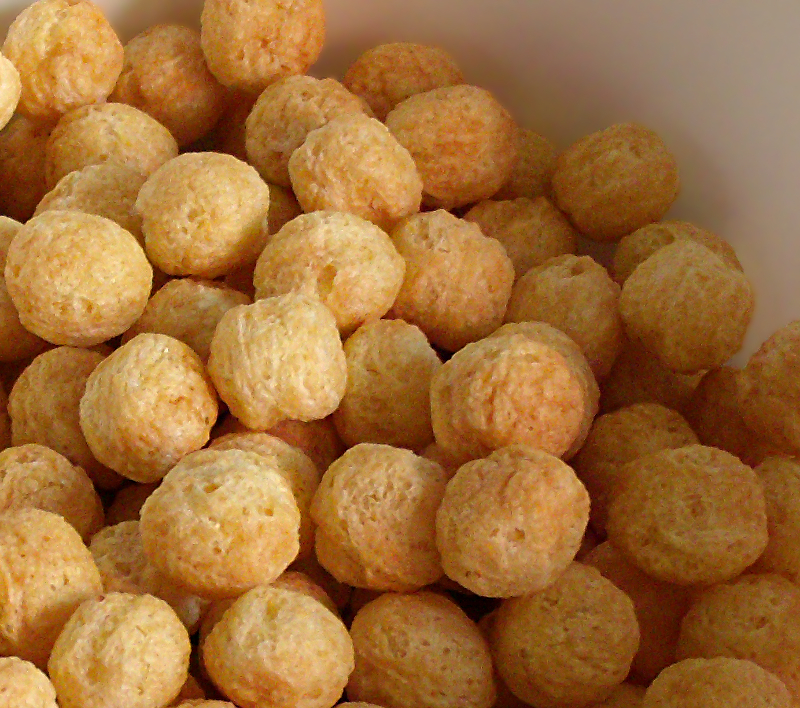
Honey Kix closeup to show texture

General Mills introduced Berry Berry Kix in 1992 and Honey Kix in 2009. Berry Berry Kix originally was shaped like actual berries, but it was eventually changed to the normal Kix shape. Both varieties were eventually discontinued. In Original Kix, total sugars are about 10% by weight, which is about 3 grams of sugar per serving. Honey Kix has 6 grams, Berry Berry Kix has 7 grams.

== Production ==
Kix cereal box, 2010

The grain is processed and expanded: water is added and the corn is pulverized. Kix are cooked in the extruder, when the dough is formed into the desired shape by extrusion through a die. It was the first cereal to be manufactured using this process.

Experimentation with the Kix puffing process led to popular brands like Cheerios, Trix, Cocoa Puffs, and Reese's Puffs also utilizing this process.

== Promotions ==
In 1947, Kix offered a Lone Ranger atomic bomb ring in exchange for a box top and 15 cents. The ring contained a spinthariscope, so that when the red base (which served as a "secret message compartment") was taken off, and after a period of time for dark adaptation, you could look through a small plastic lens at scintillations caused by polonium alpha particles striking a zinc sulfide screen.

== Ingredients ==
The original product listed its ingredients as "corn meal, tapioca, wheat germ, sugar, salt, vegetable oil, calcium carbonate, mono and di sodium phosphates, iron oxide saccharated, vitamin B, and natural vitamin G from plant sources." The current (2026) ingredients list on packaging is "Whole Grain Corn, Corn Meal, Sugar, Salt, Brown Sugar Syrup, Baking Soda, Vitamin E (mixed tocopherols) Added to Preserve Freshness."

== Advertising ==
The slogan "Kid Tested. Mother Approved." was introduced in 1978. During the 1980s, television commercials included the jingle "Kids love Kix for what Kix has got. Moms love Kix for what Kix has not," the latter a reference to its claims of no added food coloring or flavors.

In 2018, the slogan was changed to "Kid Tested. Parent Approved." At the time Mike Siemienas, General Mills spokesperson said "this new slogan is more inclusive as the word 'parent' applies to the individuals raising children."
