= Nesquik =

Brand of products made by Nestlé

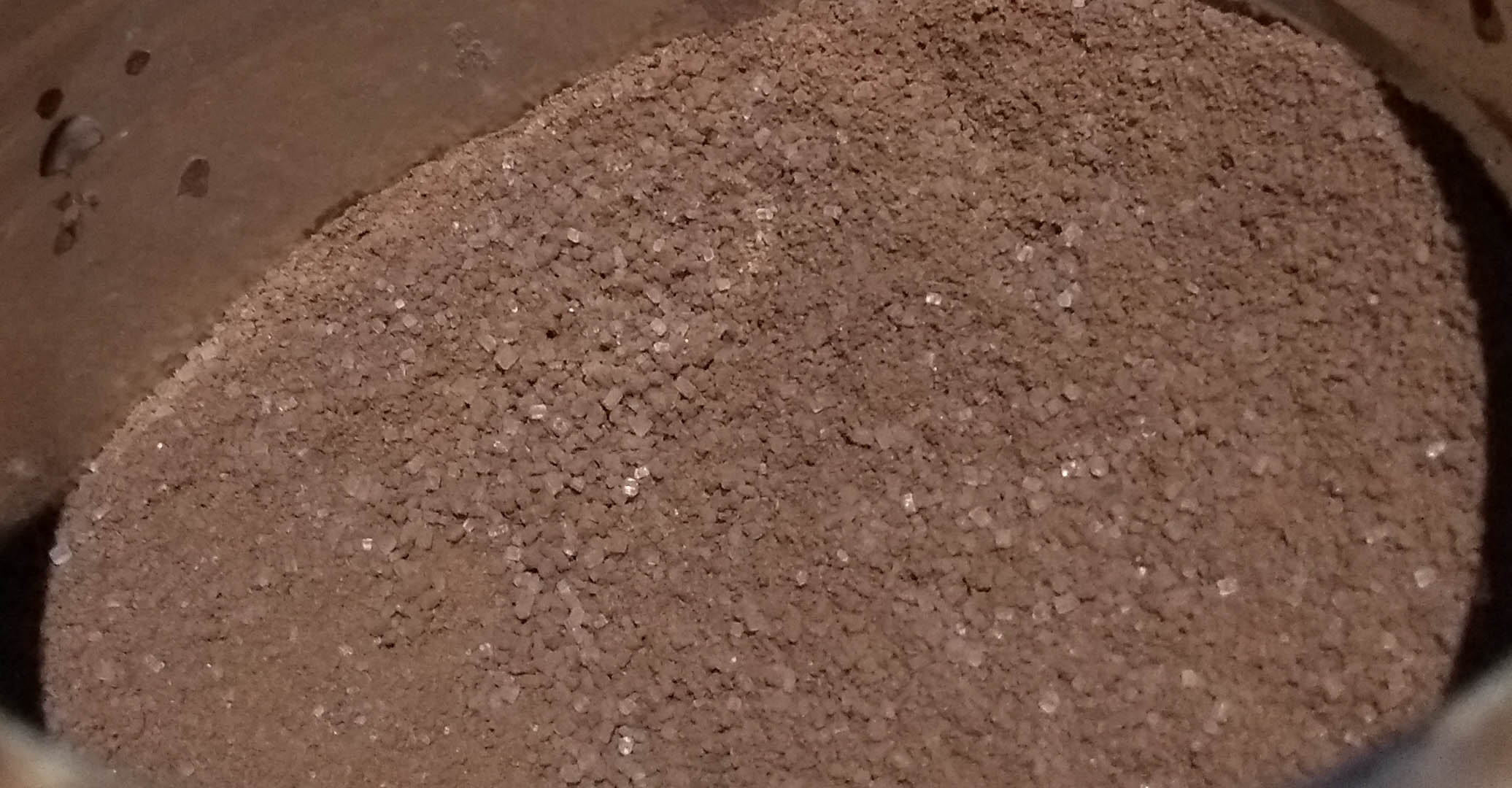
- Nesquik cocoa powder
- Product type: Powder, syrup, beverage
- Current owner: Nestlé
- Produced by: Nestlé
- Country: United States
- Introduced: September 18, 1948; 78 years ago
- Related brands: Nesquik Cereal
- Markets: Worldwide
- Website: nesquik.com

Nesquik is an American brand of food products made by Swiss company Nestlé. In 1948, Nestlé launched a drink mix for chocolate-flavored milk called Nestlé Quik in the United States; this was released in Europe during the 1950s as Nesquik.

Since 1999, the brand has been known as Nesquik worldwide. Today, the Nesquik name appears on a wide range of products, including breakfast cereals, powdered mixes for flavored milk, syrups, ready-to-drink products, candy bars, fondue fountains, hot chocolate mix, and more.

== History ==
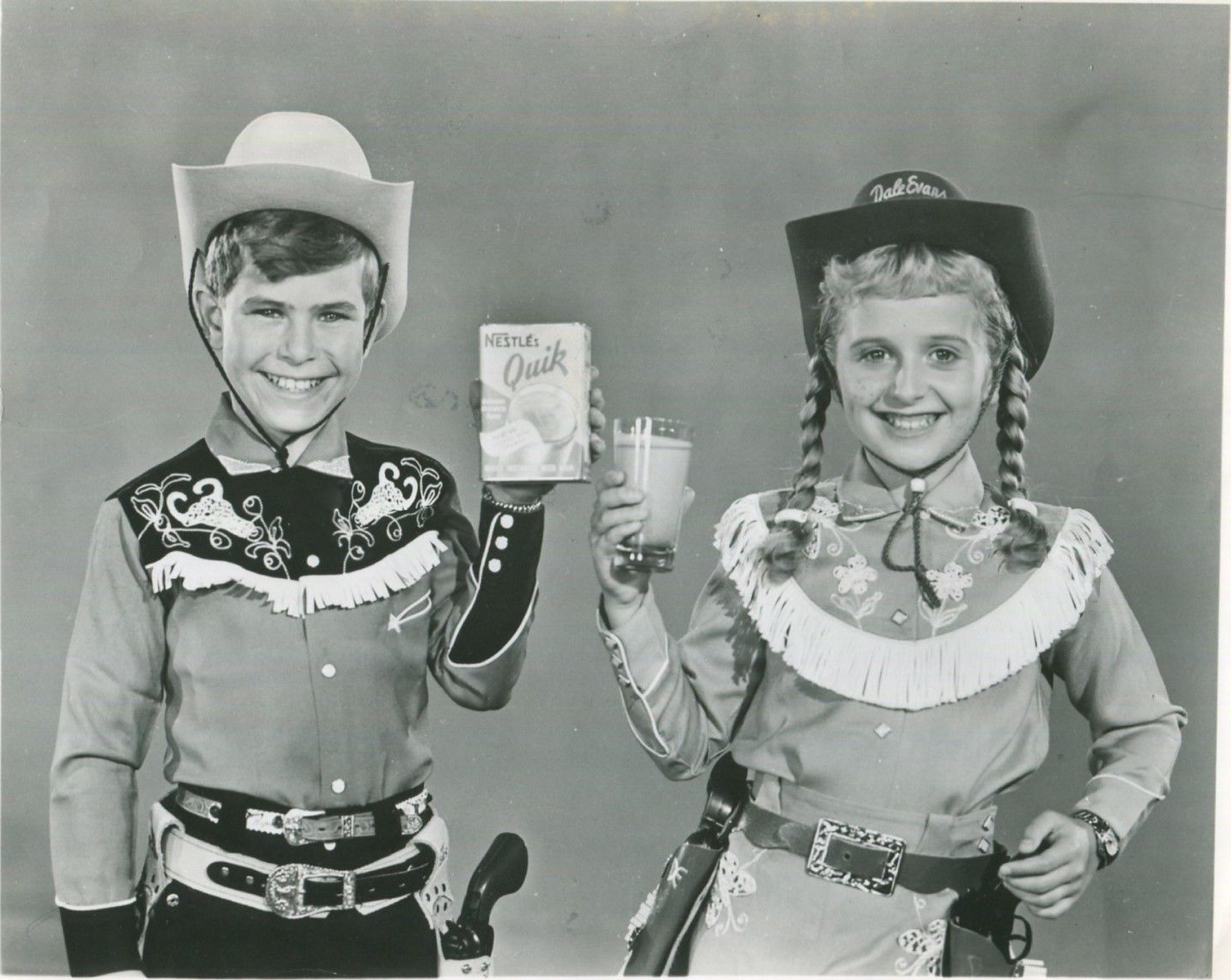
Nestlé's Quik advertisement c. 1960 featuring a young Charles Herbert

Nesquik began as a chocolate powdered flavoring mix in the United States on September 18, 1948, as Nestlé Quik. In the 1950s, it was launched in Europe as Nesquik. In countries with the Quik term (including the U.S., Canada, Mexico, and Australia, where it was originally marketed under the name Nestlé's Quik), the name was changed to the worldwide brand Nesquik in 1999. The same year, Cereal Partners Worldwide (a joint venture between Nestlé and General Mills) introduced Nesquik Cereal, a breakfast cereal that "turns milk into chocolate milk", which is similar to Cocoa Puffs. Nesquik syrup products were introduced in 1981, and ready-to-drink products were introduced in 1984.

On 8 November 2012, Nestlé USA issued a voluntary recall of limited quantities of Nesquik Chocolate Powder made and sold in the United States. Those that were recalled were of the 10.9-, 21.8-, and 40.7-ounce (309 g, 618 g, 1150 g) tins. This recall only affected the chocolate variety; it did not affect the other varieties of the mix or any other Nesquik products. This was the first known recall of a Nesquik product. These tins were taken off the market after Nestlé was informed via a supplier, Omya Inc., that it had issued a recall of certain lots of one of its own products, calcium carbonate for Salmonella contamination. The affected Nesquik chocolate mix was produced during early October 2012. All affected products had an expiration date of Best Before October 2014. Nestlé issued a statement on the recall stating, "We apologize to our consumer and sincerely regret this incident."

On 1 April 2013, the official Facebook page of Nesquik USA posted a photo on their page depicting a broccoli-flavored ready-to-drink flavor of Nesquik. However, upon closer inspection of the photo, there was a notice in the lower-left corner that it was not an actual Nestlé product. Nesquik USA announced later on the same day that it was an April Fool's joke.

In January 2017, Nestlé food scientists outlined a strategy to reformulate their drink mix to remove over half of the sugar content, citing consumer backlash against sweetened mixes and beverages.

On 26 August 2023, Nestlé South Africa announced that the company would discontinue the brand in the country due to poor sales.

== Products ==
=== Mixes ===
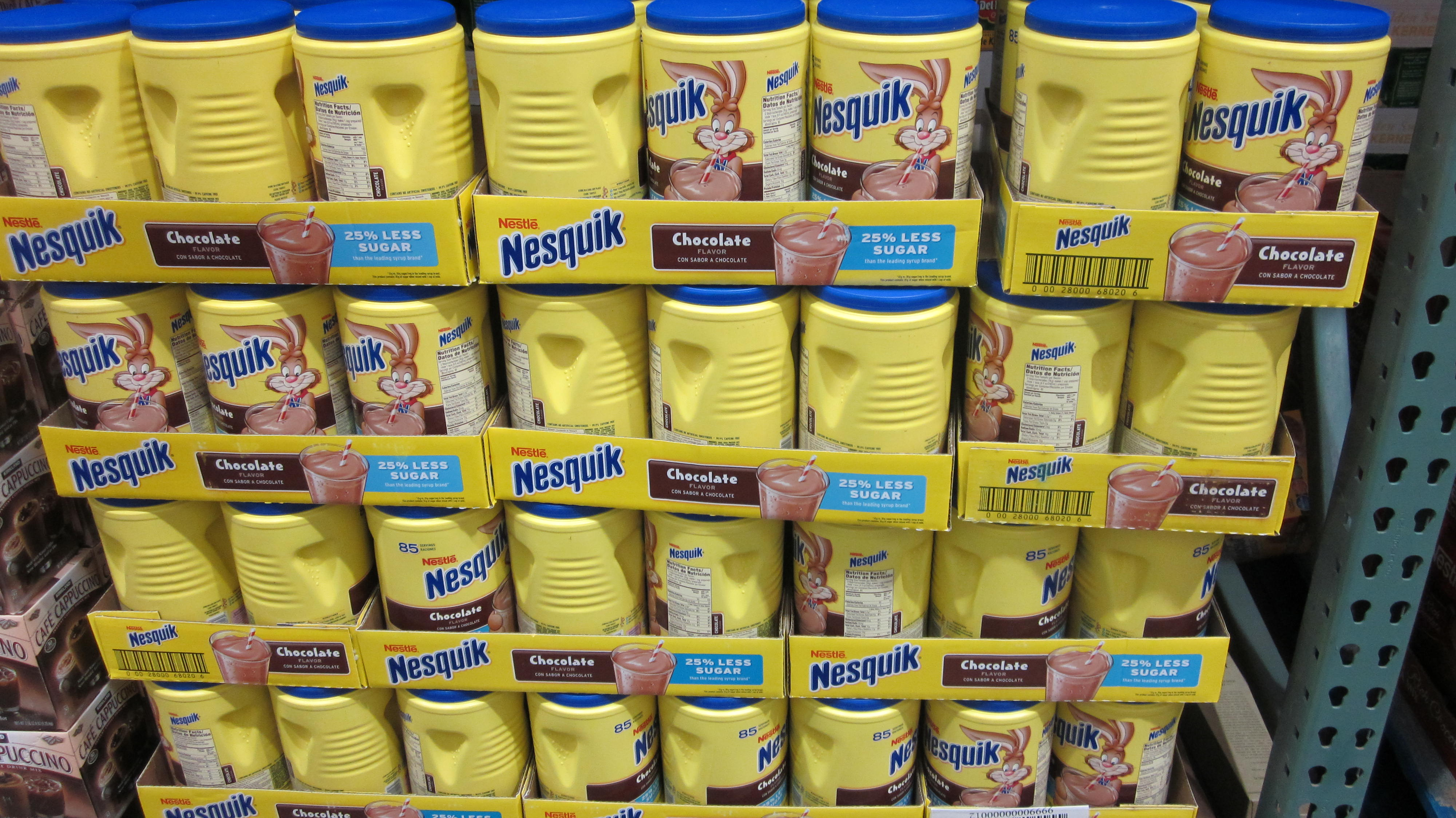
Jars of Nesquik Chocolate Powder at a Costco, U.S.

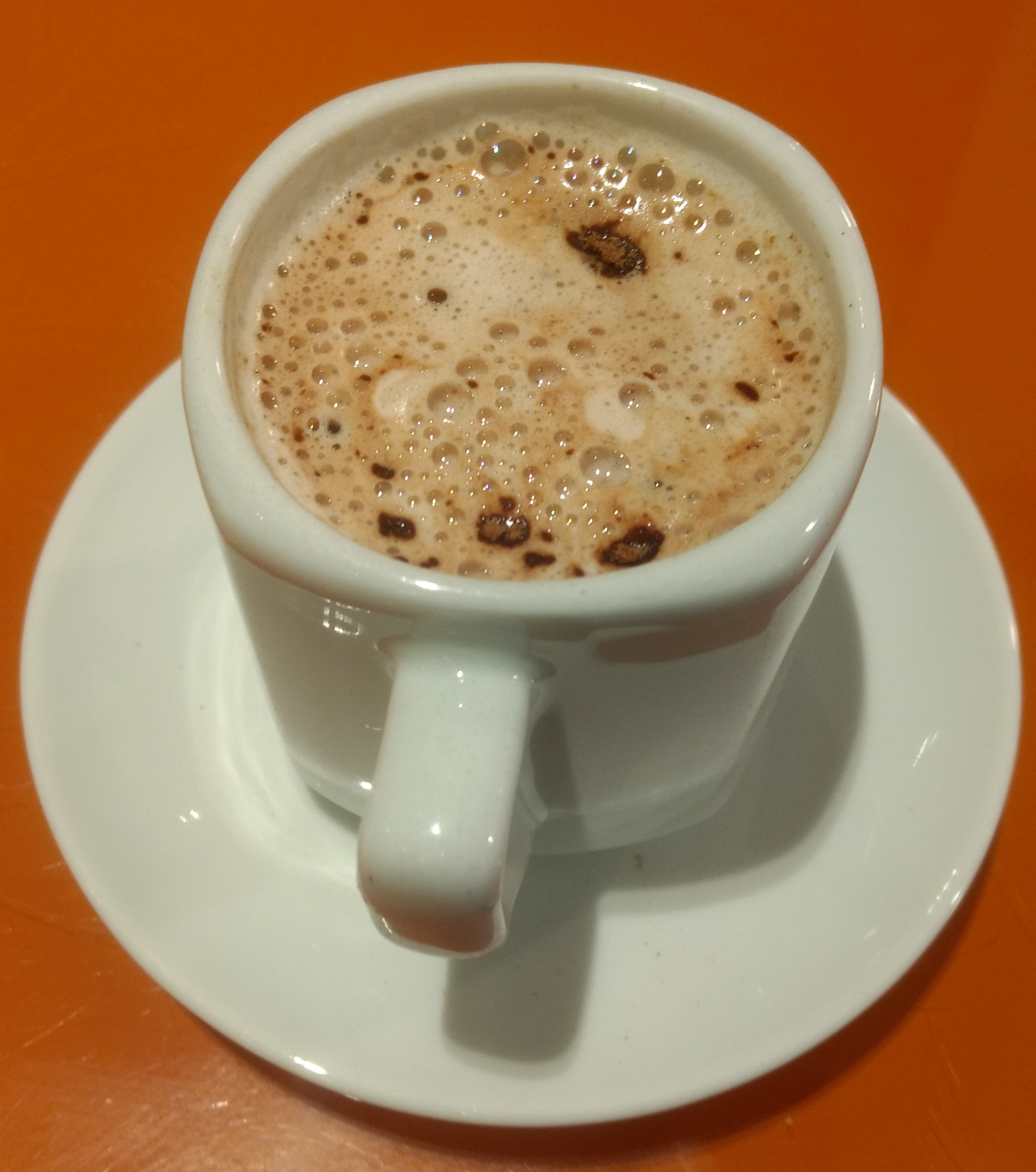
Cup of Nesquik

- Nesquik Chocolate Powder was introduced in 1948.
- Nesquik Banana Powder was introduced in 1954.
- Nesquik Strawberry Powder was introduced prior to 1960.
- Nesquik Vanilla Powder was introduced in 1979, but this was discontinued in 2006 due to low sales.
- Additional powder flavors have been introduced, but discontinued: Cherry (1989–1995), Mango (1991–2000), Cream (1997), Blueberry (exact date unknown, but early 2000s), Triple Chocolate (2002–2006), Honey (2001–2006), Crème Soda (sold in South Africa until 2015), Caramel (?–2006), Cookies & Cream.

==== Ingredients ====
The ingredients of the "classic" chocolate powder are:

- Sugar
- Cocoa powder processed with alkali
- Soy lecithin
- Carrageenan
- Salt
- Natural flavor
- Spice
- Vitamins and minerals:
  - Sodium ascorbate (vitamin C)
  - Ferric pyrophosphate (iron III)
  - Niacinamide
  - Zinc oxide
  - Thiamin hydrochloride
  - Copper gluconate
  - Manganese sulfate
  - Biotin

=== Syrups ===
Nesquik chocolate syrup was introduced in 1981. Strawberry was added in 1989. Vanilla was added in Canada in 2021. Mixed flavors such as Strawberry Banana and Chocolate Caramel have also been produced.

=== Ready-to-drink ===
Not including refrigerated Nesquik, which is made by Saputo Dairy.

- Nestlé introduced ready-to-drink Nesquik (Quik at the time) Chocolate Milk in 1983. Strawberry was added in 1987, and Banana was added in 1990. Vanilla, Double Chocolate, and Banana-Strawberry are also available.
- Fat-Free Nesquik Chocolate Milk was introduced in 1998.
- Nesquik Milkshakes come in Chocolate and Strawberry. Chocolate Caramel was introduced in 2007.
- Nestlé introduced Nesquik "Magic" Straws in 2008

The ready-to-drink versions of Nesquik ended production in 2009 in the U.K.

==== Ingredients ====
The ingredients of the ready-to-drink chocolate milk are:

- Reduced fat milk with vitamin A palmitate and vitamin D3 added
- High fructose corn syrup
- Less than 2% of:
  - Cocoa powder processed with alkali
  - Nonfat milk
  - Sugar
  - Calcium carbonate
  - Natural and artificial flavors
  - Guar gum
  - Salt
  - Carrageenan

=== Cereal ===
Nesquik Cereal is a breakfast cereal first manufactured by Cereal Partners in 1999. The cereal consists of small (about 1 cm (0.4 in) in diameter) chocolate Whole grain hollow spheres. Nesquik Cereal is most similar to General Mills' Cocoa Puffs; it is also their most direct competitor.

Nesquik Cereal is sold in dozens of countries worldwide such as the U.K., Sweden, Canada, Mexico, France, and Hong Kong. It is sold throughout Europe, Africa, Asia, Oceania, the Middle East, South America, and parts of North America. It is currently available in 43 countries. It is available in 30 grams (1.1 oz), 375 grams (13.2 oz), 500 grams (18 oz), and 700 grams (25 oz) package sizes. Most Nesquik Cereal is manufactured in France by Cereal Partners.

It is also available in two other varieties: CioccoMilk (a filled square-shaped chocolate puffed rice-and-corn cereal), and Duo (the original variety, but with white chocolate flavored rice-and-Puffcorn. A third variety was introduced in certain regions of EMEA and Kerela called DittoMilk but was discontinued.)

=== Other ===
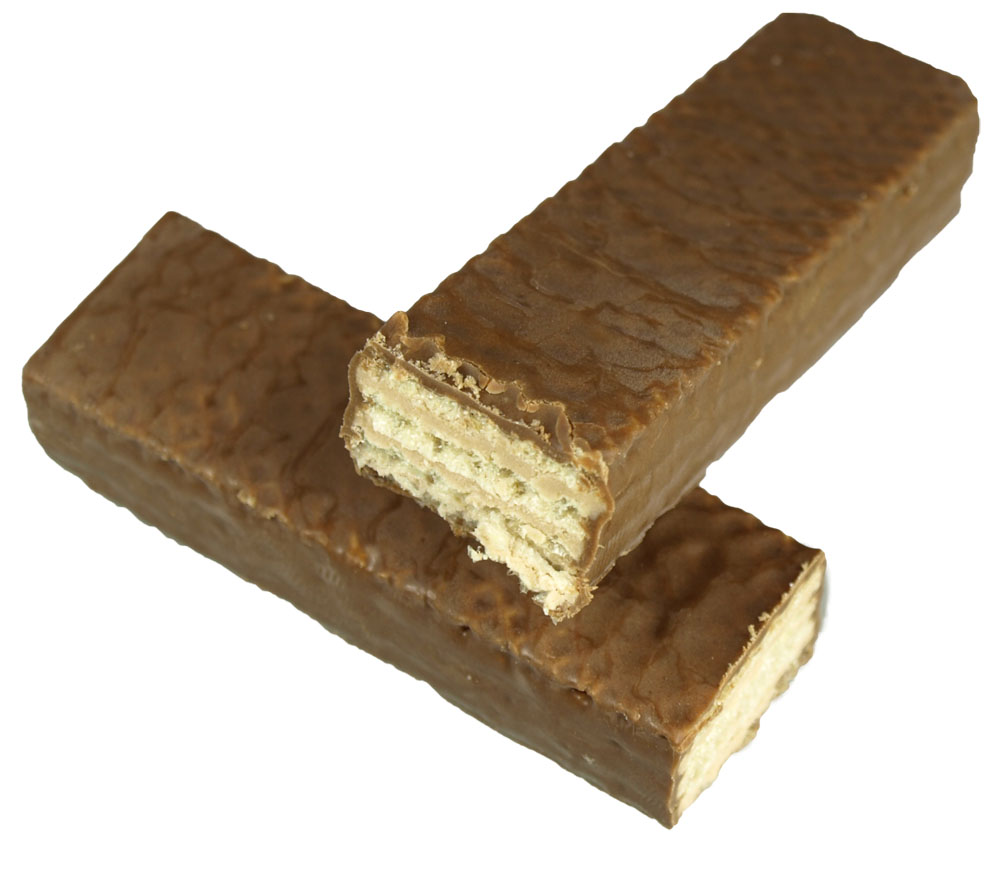
Chocolate bar

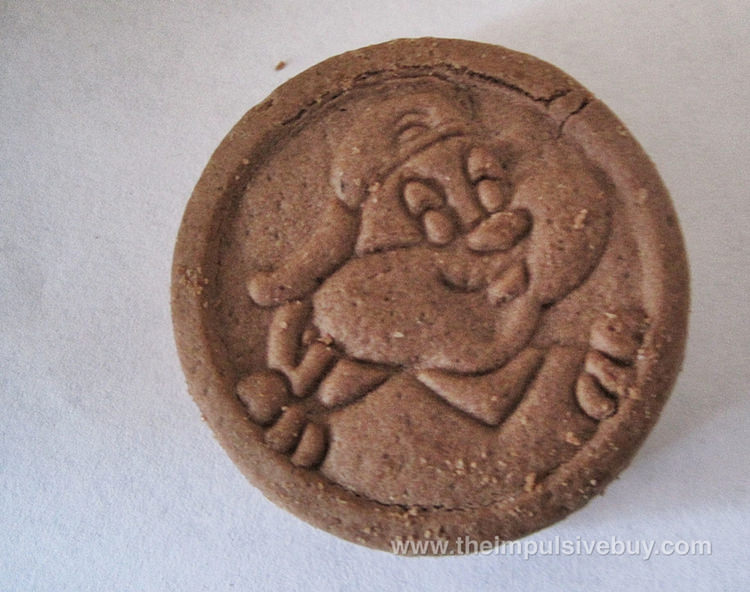
Chocolate cookie

- Nesquik chocolate candy bars were originally known as Nestlé Quik candy bars before the 1999 name change.
- A Nesquik Chocolate Fondue Fountain was made by Smart Planet Home, using the Nesquik name and logo under license.
- A Nesquik flavor of Nestlé hot cocoa mix features bunny-shaped marshmallows and advertises 38% more calcium than regular hot cocoa.
- Nesquik Chocolate Pots, a chocolate fromage frais range was available in the U.K..
- Nesquik is available for the Dolce Gusto system.
- Nesquik is available as a flavor of Ice-Screamers frozen novelties made by Nestlé.
- Nesquik sponsored a Nesquik race car for advertising and marketing purposes.
- Nesquik Milk Slice, a sponge cake with chocolate flavor yogurt filling is available in the U.K.

== Advertising campaigns ==
Nesquik has had hundreds of various advertising campaigns over its long history, having had print ads at the Tour de France, and Olympics in recent years. It has been advertised with various mascots.

=== Jimmy Nelson, Danny O'Day, and Farfel ===
In 1955, Nestlé hired ventriloquist Jimmy Nelson to do its advertising on children's television programming. Nelson's dummy Danny O'Day would say that Quik "makes milk taste...like a mill-ion" (dollars). Danny and a dog named Farfel would finish the commercials by singing Nestlé's brand-new signature jingle:

Danny: N-E-S-T-L-E-S,
Nestlé's makes the very best...
Farfel: Choc-'late

Farfel would finish with the sound of his jaw snapping shut. This effect was accidentally invented when Nelson's sweaty finger (a result of nervousness) slipped off the mouth control during his first audition in front of the Nestlé executives. This would normally be a serious technical mistake for a ventriloquist, but they actually liked it so much that they insisted that Nelson keep it in. Nelson performed the jingle that way for 10 years.

=== Nesquik Bunny (a.k.a. Quicky) ===
Nesquik Bunny's first commercial appearance from 1973

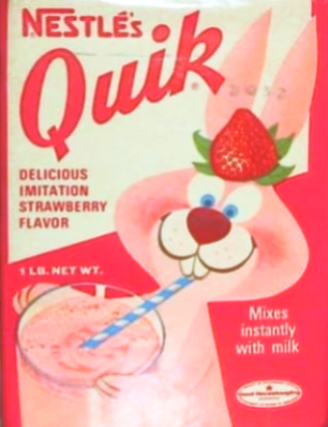
First Quik Bunny Appearance from 1960 on Pink Color

A cartoon Quik Bunny first appeared on the cans of the strawberry flavor when it was introduced. Later, an anthropomorphic animated bunny wearing a large red "Q" on a collar-like necklace, was introduced in television commercials as the new chocolate Quik mascot. He debuted in 1960 and first appeared in his first TV commercial in 1973. In the television commercials Quicky's voice acting work is performed by Barry Gordon, but sometimes also by other actors. The mascot's outlook was somewhat redesigned from 2005 and onwards to appear more detailed and modern.

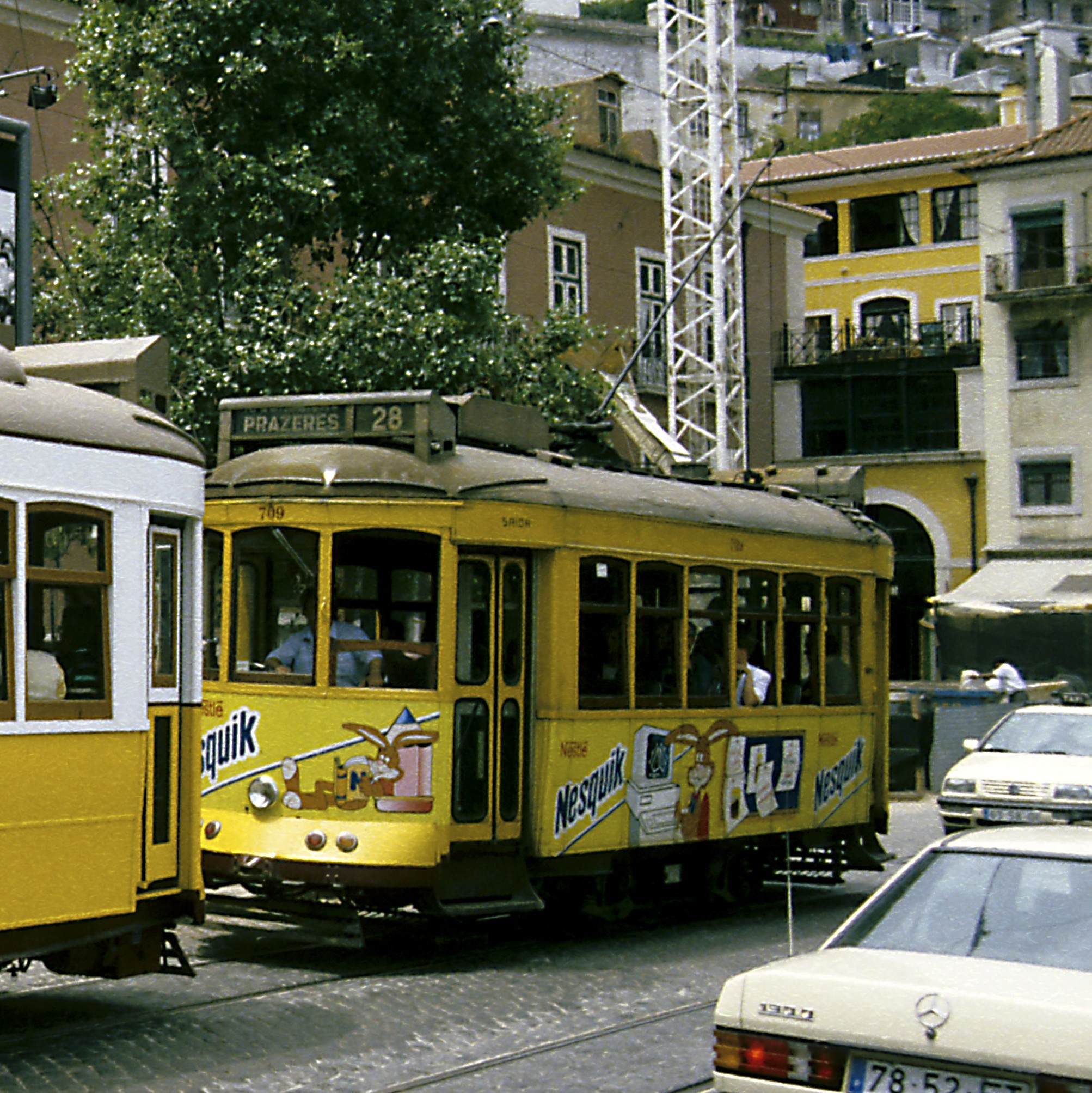
The Nesquik Bunny in an advertisement for Nesquik on a tram in Lisbon, Portugal, in 1996

In the U.S. by 1999, the Quik Bunny was renamed the Nesquik Bunny and his "Q" changed to an "N" when the brand name was changed. He appears on the packaging and marketing and has appeared in the product's television commercials. The artist who made the redesign of the Bunny for its global implantation in the 1990s was the cartoonist Ramon Maria Casanyes. In France, Italy, and Canada, he is known as Quicky the Nesquik Bunny. In Spain, there was no mascot prior to the introduction of Quicky in 1990/1991.

The Nesquik Bunny is also featured on the packaging and advertisements for other Nesquik products. A LEGO minifigure version of Quicky was released in 2001.

==== Appearances in other media ====
- A 1984 The Adventures of Quik Bunny comic featuring Spider-Man.
- A 1987 promotional comic with Superman.
- A 2013 advertisement on Nickelodeon featuring Sam & Cat co-stars Ariana Grande and Jennette McCurdy.

=== Groquik (Quikáras) ===
France and Greece first had another mascot for Nesquik, which was a giant fat yellow hippopotamus-like cartoon creature with a deep voice, wearing a hat with red and white stripes, called Groquik—a variation of Gros Quik ("Fat Quik"), created by Gilbert Mast and puppeteered by Yves Brunier. In Greece, the mascot was called Κουικάρας (or Quikáras—English: "Big Quik"). He was later replaced by Quicky, much to the discontent of fans who protested against the lack of a sympathetic character and the Americanism.

The character was created in 1978. His first appearance was in the French magazine Téléjunior in April 1979. The designer of the character was Gilbert Mas. In the French advertisements where Groquik was depicted, he was a puppet character portrayed by renowned French puppeteer Yves Brunier, who manufactured and portrayed puppets as a ventriloquist. He has also created famous characters such as Casimir, L'Île aux enfants, and worked on The Muppet Show.

=== Cangurik ===
In Portugal, the mascot was a kangaroo, Cangurik, which was replaced by Quicky in 1989/1990. The song "Cangurik" was recorded by Suzy Paula in 1982. Joel Branco recorded "Uma Árvore, Um Amigo", with Cangurik on the cover, in 1984. "Amigos do cangurik" (1986) was a collection of trading cards. There was a club named "Clube do Cangurik".

=== Mr. Nesquik ===
In Italy, before the arrival of Quicky, the mascot was an anthropomorphized box of Nesquik called Mr. Nesquik. Especially in the 1980s, he represented a popular and easily recognizable advertising character thanks to TV commercials (featuring a jingle based on the music of Oh! Susanna), press advertisements (most notably on Topolino comic books), and to the many complimentary gadgets included with every box of Nesquik powdered chocolate throughout the years, all bearing his image. Mr. Nesquik made his final appearance around 1990, concomitant with Quicky's introduction, for the promotion of a new gadget, the Volaquik, already depicting the latter character, making for a symbolic relay between the two mascots.

== See also ==
- Milo (drink)
- Cola Cao
- Ovaltine
- Carnation Instant Breakfast
- Nescafe
