= Chocapic =

Chocolate-flavoured whole-grain breakfast cereal distributed by Nestlé

- Product type: Breakfast cereal
- Current owner: Nestlé
- Produced by: Cereal Partners Worldwide
- Country: Switzerland
- Introduced: 1984; 42 years ago
- Website: nestle.com/chocapic

Chocapic, known as Koko Krunch in Asia and most of the Middle East, is a chocolate-flavored whole-grain breakfast cereal distributed by Nestlé in most of Europe, Asia, the Middle East, and Latin America. The cereal was introduced in 1984. It has been available to consumers in Portugal since 1986.

== Overview ==
The cereal consists of cocoa flavored wheat flakes. Chocapic is available in 30 grams, and 375 grams packages. The cereal's mascot is Pico (Koko the Koala in Asia), a dog that loves chocolate, and is always referring to the fact that Chocapic has a strong chocolate flavour. In later advertisements he is seen with a child preventing several thieves from stealing the cereal and explaining the origin of Chocapic (the most usual explanation being that a balloon filled with chocolate burst and landed in a field, creating the choco petals). A new product related to this cereal, Chocapic Duo, has been recently created, which features the usual chocolate petals, as well as white chocolate flavored petals.

== Similar products ==
Similar in flavor and texture to Chocos by Arqui. Somewhat similar to other chocolate-flavored cereals like Cocoa Krispies (also known as Coco Pops or Choco Krispies outside North America) and Cocoa Puffs (Nesquik outside North America).
