= Cheerios =

Breakfast cereal made by General Mills

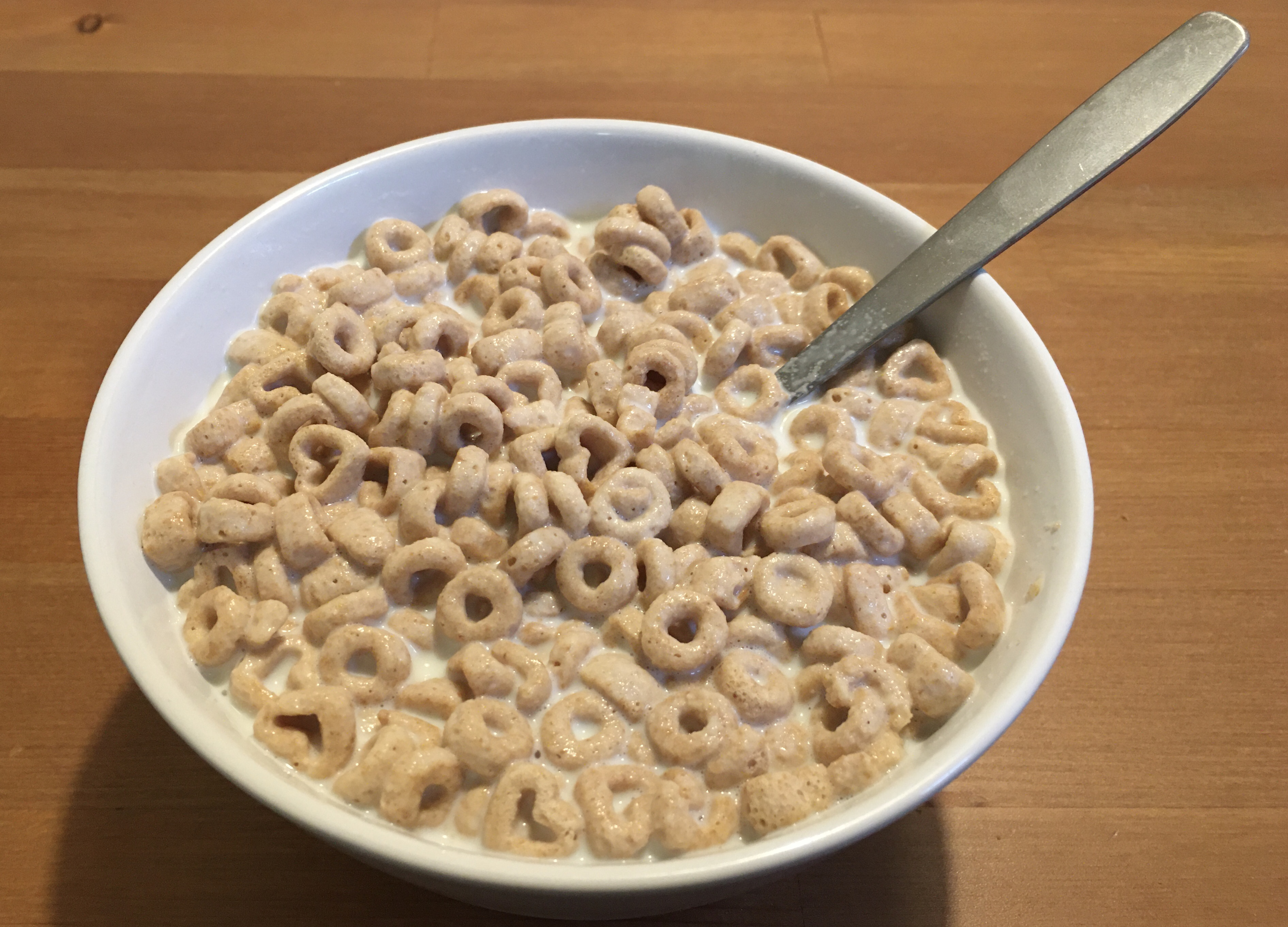
- A bowl of Cheerios cereal (Limited edition "With Happy Heart Shapes", c. 2022)
- Product type: Breakfast cereal
- Current owner: General Mills
- Produced by: General Mills (US/Canada); Nestlé (Europe/Mexico); Uncle Tobys (Australia/New Zealand)
- Country: United States
- Introduced: May 1, 1941; 85 years ago
- Tagline: Good Goes Around
- Website: cheerios.com

Cheerios
Nutritional value per 1 cup (28 g)
- Energy: 100 kcal (420 kJ)
- Carbohydrates: 20
- Sugars: 1
- Dietary fiber: 3
- Fat: 2
- Saturated: 0.5
- Trans: 0
- Protein: 3
Vitamins and minerals
Vitamins	Quantity %DV^{†}
Vitamin A equiv.	1% 10 μg
Vitamin C	11% 10 mg
Minerals	Quantity %DV^{†}
Calcium	1% 10 mg
Iron	250% 45 mg
Potassium	6% 180 mg
Sodium	6% 140 mg
- Other constituents: Quantity
- Cholesterol: 0
- ^{†}Percentages estimated using US recommendations for adults, except for potassium, which is estimated based on expert recommendation from the National Academies.

Cheerios is a brand of breakfast cereal manufactured by General Mills in the United States and Canada, consisting of pulverized oats in the shape of a solid torus. In Europe, Cheerios is marketed by Cereal Partners under the Nestlé brand; in Australia and New Zealand, Cheerios is sold as an Uncle Tobys product.

Cheerios were invented in the United States in 1941 by General Mills. The product's original name was Cheerioats, but General Mills changed it to Cheerios in 1945, following a trademark complaint from competitor Quaker Oats Company over the use of the term "oats."

== "Cheerioats" (1941–45) ==
Cheerios were introduced on May 1, 1941, as "Cheerioats." The name was shortened to "Cheerios" in 1945, after the Quaker Oats Company claimed to hold the rights to use the term "oats"; Quaker had also introduced its "Quaker Oaties" ready-to-eat cereal in early May 1941.

An early 1942 U.S. newspaper advertisement—prepared and copyrighted by General Mills—listed the ready-to-eat cereal's ingredients: "Ground Oatmeal (75%), Corn Flour (10%), Tapioca (10%), Together With Sugar, Salt, Sodium Phosphate, Calcium Phosphate, Coconut Oil..." Vitamin content was listed as "Vitamin B1 (Thiamin)...Vitamin G (Riboflavin)...Iron, Phosphorous and Calcium...in full oatmeal amounts."

== Cheerios history ==
Cheerios' production was based upon the extrusion process invented for Kix in 1937. The oat flour process starts in Minneapolis before being shipped to factories in Iowa, Georgia, and Buffalo, New York.

In 1976, 35 years after the cereal was first introduced, "Cinnamon Nut Cheerios" became the first alternate variety of Cheerios to be sold in stores. Nearly 3 years later, in 1979, "Honey Nut Cheerios" was introduced. General Mills sold approximately 1.8 million cases of Honey Nut Cheerios in its first year.

Since their introduction, Cheerios have become a popular baby food. Generally first fed to children aged 9–12 months, General Mills claims that Cheerios serve to help infants transition to eating solid food, as well as develop fine motor skills.

== Ingredients ==
The main ingredients of original Cheerios are oats, corn starch, sugar and salt. There is very little sugar compared to other dry breakfast cereals from major brands, so Cheerios has long been a preferred cereal for parents trying to limit their children's sugar intake. However, later variants of Cheerios range from moderately sugared (Multigrain Cheerios) to heavily sugared (e.g. Honey Nut Cheerios).

In January 2014, General Mills announced that it would halt the use of genetically modified ingredients in original Cheerios. However, General Mills notes for Original Cheerios that "trace amounts of genetically modified (also known as 'genetically engineered') material may be present due to potential cross contact during manufacturing and shipping." In February 2015, the company announced that it would be making Cheerios gluten-free by removing the traces of wheat, rye, and barley that usually come into contact with the oat supply used to make Cheerios during transportation to the General Mills plant in Buffalo, New York, along Lake Erie.

In the United Kingdom, Cheerios differ somewhat from their US counterpart, being made from oats, wheat and barley, thus Cheerios in the United Kingdom are not gluten-free. Cheerios in the United States are made solely from oats and, since 2015, can be called gluten-free.

== Advertising ==
Many television commercials for Cheerios have targeted children, featuring animated characters (such as a Honey bee). Bullwinkle was featured in early 1960s commercials, with the tagline at the end of the ad being "Go with Cheerios!" followed by Bullwinkle, usually worse for wear due to his Cheerios-inspired bravery somewhat backfiring, saying "...but watch where you're going!" Hoppity Hooper was also featured in ads in the mid-1960s; General Mills was the primary sponsor of his animated program.

=== Cheeri O'Leary ===
This cartoon character, a cheery young girl, was seen in 1942–1943 magazine advertising and Sunday newspaper's comics sections. These ads were multi-panel cartoons where Cheeri O'Leary interacted with entertainers of the day, including Charlotte Greenwood, Barbara Stanwyck, Dick Powell, Joan Blondell, Johnny Mack Brown, Betty Hutton, and Claudette Colbert. The character disappeared from ads in 1944, but reappeared in 1946 in ads that mostly featured Joe.

=== Joe ===
Beginning in 1944, a cartoon boy, simply named "Joe," appeared in ads placed in Sunday newspaper comics sections.

=== The Cheerios Kid ===
Beginning in the mid-1950s and continuing through the early 1960s, "The Cheerios Kid" was a mainstay in Cheerios commercials. The Kid, after eating Cheerios, quickly dealt with whatever problem presented in the commercial, using oat-produced "Big-G, little-o" "Go-power." By the late 1960s, there was a jingle called "Get Yourself Go" (written by Neil Diamond), which played as the two used power to solve the problem. The character was revived briefly in the late 1980s in similar commercials. In 2012, The Cheerios Kid and his sidekick Sue were revived in an internet video that showed how Cheerios "can lower cholesterol." Video clips of "the Kid" and Sue are part of a montage included in a 2014 TV commercial, along with clips of the Honey Nut Cheerios bee's early commercials.

=== Peanuts ===
In 1984 and 1985, characters from the comic strip Peanuts were featured in many Cheerios commercials. In the commercials, the characters become tired in the middle of performing an activity (e.g. taking a dance lesson, or playing tennis), but then another character tells them that they did not have a healthy Cheerios breakfast. Then, at the end of the commercial, the character would be energized, followed by children singing "You're on your toes with Cheerios!"

=== Spoonfuls of Stories ===
The Spoonfuls of Stories program, begun in 2002, is sponsored by Cheerios and a 50/50 joint venture of General Mills and Simon & Schuster. Mini-sized versions of Simon & Schuster children's books are published within the program when the book drive occurs. The program also includes a New Author contest; winners' books are published in miniature inside boxes of Cheerios.

=== Shawn Johnson ===
In 2009, Olympic gold medalist and World Champion gymnast Shawn Johnson became the first athlete to have her photo featured on the front of the Cheerios box. The limited edition was distributed in the Midwestern region of the United States by the Hy-Vee grocery store chain.

=== Just Checking ===
In 2013, a Cheerios commercial aired, titled "Just Checking," showcasing an interracial family in which a daughter asks her mother (white) if Cheerios is good for the heart, as her father (black) mentioned. The mother says the cereal is suitable according to the box, which states that whole grain oats lower cholesterol. The next scene features the father waking up as a pile of Cheerios spills down his chest, which the daughter placed there having taken her father's words literally. The commercial received unintentional notoriety due to intense backlash. This was so extreme that General Mills disabled further comments on the video.

In 2014, General Mills released a Super Bowl ad titled "Gracie," featuring the same family: in the commercial, the father, using Cheerios to illustrate his meaning, tells the daughter that a new baby is coming, that her mother is pregnant, and the daughter accepts this—as long as they also get a puppy—and the father agrees, while the mother looks a little surprised.

=== Vortexx ===
To promote the premiere of the Vortexx Saturday morning block on The CW Television Network in August 2012, special boxes of Cheerios were branded as "Vortexx O's," complete with the schedule on the back, and the wordmark plastered on one of the Vortexx promotional backgrounds. Toys were also included in the box, featuring John Cena, Iron Man, and the Pink Power Ranger.

=== Good Goes Around ===
In 2017, Latrell James was hired to sing a song for a new Cheerios commercial, with the refrain "Good goes around and around and around."

=== Murray the Brave ===
In May 2020, during the COVID-19 pandemic in Canada, it partnered with Food Banks Canada to do a tribute to food bank workers.

=== Return of "Cheerioats" for 80th Anniversary ===
Beginning in July 2021, a limited re-release of Cheerios cereal was made across North American markets by reusing the original-brand name "Cheerioats" instead of "Cheerios." Cheerioats used the same ingredients as modern-day Cheerios but were repackaged in a throwback campaign to celebrate the 80th anniversary of Cheerios cereals being sold (1941–2021).

== Products ==
Cereals

- Cheerios (originally named Cheerioats) (1941)
- Cinnamon Nut Cheerios (1976) (test flavor)
- Honey Nut Cheerios (1979)
- Peanut Butter Cheerios (peanut butter flavored Cheerios) (discontinued)
- Apple Cinnamon Cheerios (1988)
- Multi Grain Cheerios (Original in the UK) (released 1992, relaunched 2009)
- Frosted Cheerios (1995) (not related to Frosty O's)
- Yogurt Burst Cheerios (variations included vanilla and strawberry) (2005) (discontinued)
- Fruity Cheerios (2006) (Cheerios sweetened with fruit juice) (originally produced from 2006-2021, relaunched in 2024)
- Oat Cluster Crunch Cheerios (2007) (sweetened Cheerios with oat clusters)
- Banana Nut Cheerios (2009) (sweetened Cheerios made with banana puree) (limited edition)
- Chocolate Cheerios (2010) (Cheerios made with cocoa)
- Cinnamon Burst Cheerios (2011) (Cheerios made with cinnamon) (discontinued)
- MultiGrain Peanut Butter Cheerios (2012) (discontinued)
- Multi Grain Cheerios Dark Chocolate Crunch (2013) (discontinued)
- Cheerios Protein (variations included Oats & Honey and Cinnamon Almond) (2014) (discontinued)
- Ancient Grain Cheerios (2015) (sweetened Cheerios made with "ancient grains like kamut wheat, spelt, and quinoa") (discontinued)
- Pumpkin Spice Cheerios (sweetened Cheerios made with pumpkin purée and pumpkin pie spices) (2016) (limited edition)
- Chocolate Peanut Butter Cheerios (a blend of two types of sweetened Cheerios, one with a cocoa coating, the other with peanut butter) (Limited Edition in 2016, made permanent in 2017). Later discontinued.
- Strawberry Cheerios (sweetened Cheerios made with strawberry purée) (2017) (Limited Edition)
- Very Berry Cheerios (sweetened Cheerios with strawberry, blueberry, and raspberry flavors) (2017)
- Peach Cheerios (sweetened Cheerios made with peach purée) (2018) (Limited Edition)
- Blueberry Cheerios (with blueberry purée concentrate) (2019) (discontinued)
- Maple Cheerios (sweetened with maple syrup) (2017 in Canada, 2019 in the United States) (discontinued)
- Cinnamon Cheerios (made with cinnamon) (2020) (discontinued)
- Toasted Coconut Cheerios (limited edition) (2020)
- Frosted Vanilla Cheerios (2021 in Canada only)
- Chocolate Strawberry Cheerios (limited edition) (2021)
- Banana Caramel Cheerios (limited edition) (2022) (reappeared in 2026)
- Honey Vanilla Cheerios (2022) (limited edition)
- Strawberry Banana Cheerios (2022)
- Frosted Lemon Cheerios (limited edition) (2023) (reappeared in 2025)
- Peach Mango Cheerios (limited edition) (2024)
- Cheerios Veggie Blends (2024) "sweetened oat & corn cereal" .."with spinach, carrot, and sweet potato"... claiming 1/4 cup (~60 mL) "fruit and veggies per serving")
- Cheerios Protein (2024) (cinnamon, strawberry, and cookies and cream)
- Confetti Cheerios (2026)
- Cheerios Oat Crunch (flavors include almond, cinnamon, oats 'n honey and chocolate)

Licensed products

- Crispy Oats (manufactured by Millville, distributed by ALDI)
- Purely O's (Organic Cheerios, manufactured by General Mills subsidiary Cascadian Farms) (1999)
- Oat Cheerios (Republic of Ireland only, manufactured by Cereal Partners Worldwide, sold under the Nestlé brand)

=== Discontinued products ===
- Cheerios and X's (1993)
- Team Cheerios (formerly Team USA Cheerios) (1996–2003)
- Millenios (Cheerios with "2"-shaped cereal pieces) (1999–2000)
- Berry Burst Cheerios (including variations of Strawberry, Strawberry Banana, Cherry Vanilla and Triple Berry) (2003)
- Dulce de Leche Cheerios (2012) (sweetened Cheerios made with caramel)

== 2009 FDA demand ==
In May 2009, the U.S. Food and Drug Administration sent a letter to General Mills indicating that Cheerios was being sold as an unapproved new drug, due to labeling which read in part:

- "You can Lower Your Cholesterol 4% in 6 weeks"
- "Did you know that in just 6 weeks Cheerios can reduce bad cholesterol by an average of 4 percent? Cheerios is ... clinically proven to lower cholesterol. A clinical study showed that eating two [1.5 cups (~360 mL)] servings daily of Cheerios cereal reduced bad cholesterol when eaten as part of a diet low in saturated fat and cholesterol."

The FDA letter indicated that General Mills needed to change the way it marketed Cheerios or apply for federal approval to sell Cheerios as a drug. General Mills responded with a statement that the FDA had approved their claim of soluble fiber content, and that claims about lowering cholesterol had been featured on the box for two years.

In 2012, the FDA followed up with a letter approving the Cheerios labeling and declaring that the matter was moot and required no further action. The specific '4%' claim was eventually withdrawn; current (2026) promotion asserts that Cheerios “Can Help Lower Cholesterol as Part of a Heart-Healthy Diet."

== See also ==
- Cheerios effect
- Cruncheroos
