= Cocoa Krispies =

Cocoa flavored version of Rice Krispies

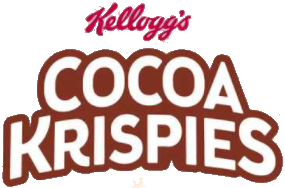

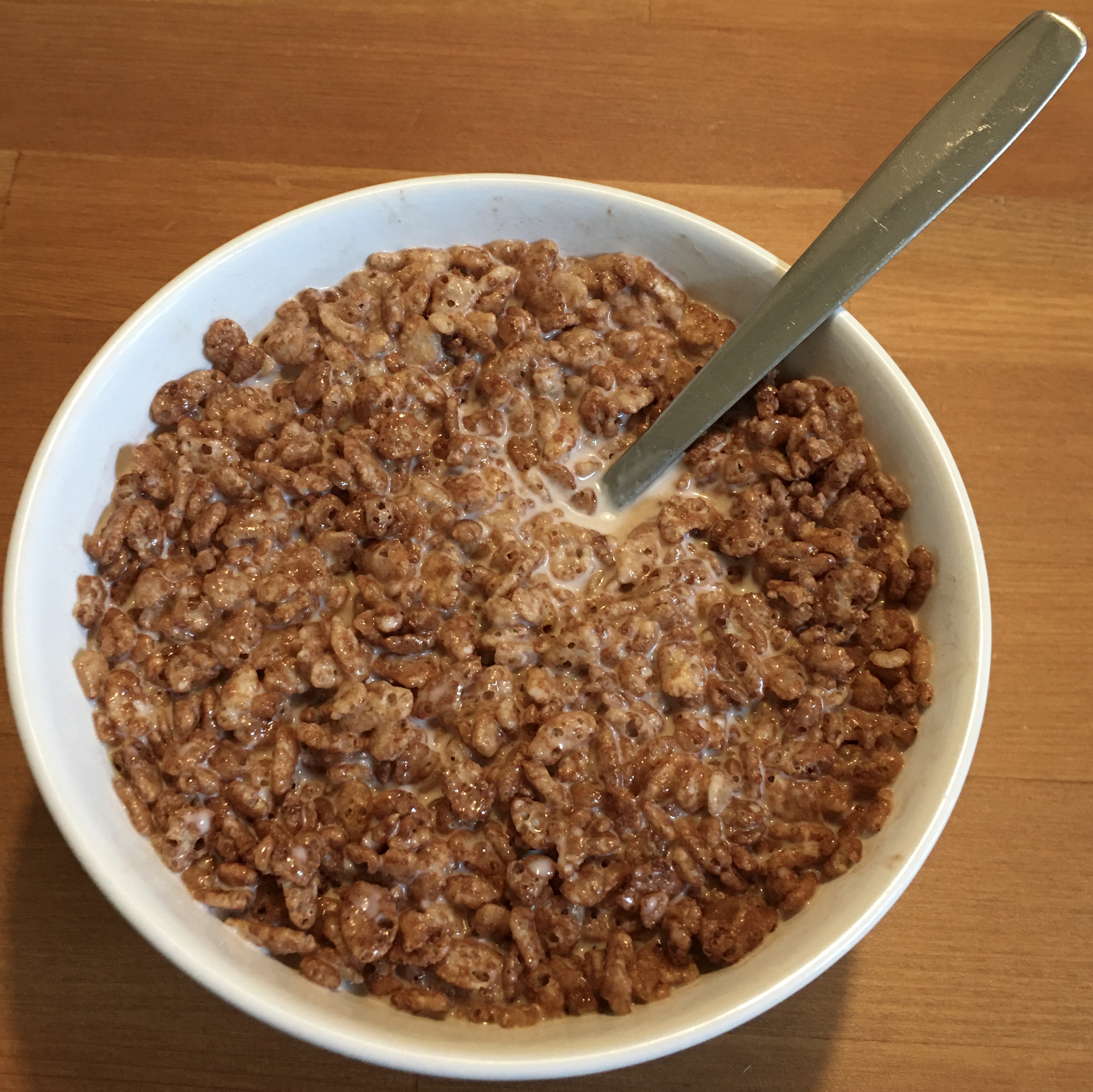
- Cocoa Krispies with milk
- Product type: Breakfast cereal
- Current owner: WK Kellogg Co
- Produced by: WK Kellogg Co
- Country: United States
- Introduced: 1958; 68 years ago
- Related brands: Rice Krispies; Chocos
- Markets: International
- Called Coco Pops in the UK, Ireland, Australia, New Zealand, and Turkey.

Cocoa Krispies (also known as Choco Krispis, Choco Krispies, Coco Pops, Choco Pops depending on region) is a breakfast cereal produced by WK Kellogg Co (formerly Kellogg's) marketed both as a boxed cereal and as a snack bar with a 'dried milk' covered bottom. It is a cocoa flavored version of Rice Krispies which contains real chocolate.

The cereal was introduced in the United States in 1958. In 2003, the cereal was renamed "Cocoa Rice Krispies", as Kellogg's endeavored to unite their Rice Krispies variations under a single marketing schema. In 2006, the name was changed back to Cocoa Krispies. Kellogg's has released variations of Cocoa Krispies such as "Cocoa Krispies Cereal Straws", "Cocoa Krispies Choconilla", and Chocos.

== Other markets ==
The cereal is known as Choco Krispies in Mexico, the Dominican Republic, El Salvador, Costa Rica, Honduras, Colombia, Guatemala, Panama, Venezuela, Ecuador, Peru, Bolivia, Brazil, Chile, Paraguay, Uruguay, Argentina, Portugal, Spain, Germany, Austria, and Switzerland.

It was introduced in the United Kingdom as Coco Pops in 1963, and is also known by that name in the Netherlands, Denmark, Saudi Arabia, Nigeria, Bulgaria, Ghana, Malta, New Zealand, Republic of Ireland, Finland, France, Italy, Greece, Sweden, Belgium, South Africa, Kenya, Uganda, Ukraine, Botswana, Hong Kong, Lebanon, Australia, Turkey, and South Korea. Later in the 1960s, the name was changed to Coco Krispies, but subsequently reverted to Coco Pops.

The cereal was available in Canada, but was discontinued at some point in the early 1990s. Instead, Kellogg's used to sell a variant called Rice Krispies Cocoa, which is simply Rice Krispies with a light chocolate flavor, but no longer do so. Several spin off cereals using the "Coco Pops" name, such as "Caramel Flavoured Coco Pops", "Coco Pops Crunchers", "Coco Chex", "Coco Rocks", "Coco Pops Straws", "Coco Pops Moon & Stars", "Coco Pops Choc-N-Roll" and "Coco Pops Croc Prints" (shaped like Crafty Croc's feet) have also been released by Kellogg's in some countries.

Chocos were introduced in some countries as "Coco Pops Mega Munchers". A chocolate-flavoured porridge variant had been available in the late 2000s called Coco Pops Porridge, but didn't last long. Since 2014, they have been brought back.

=== United Kingdom ===
In February 1998, the British arm of Kellogg's renamed the brand in the country Choco Krispies, but sales quickly declined, and in the spring of 1999, a telephone and internet poll with over one million voters found that 92% of voters wanted the name changed back to Coco Pops. Thus, Kellogg's reverted to the original name in May 1999. The advertising campaign for the poll featured Screaming Lord Sutch as the returning officer in a town hall election setting.

== Mascots ==
Cocoa Krispies first appeared in the United States in 1958, represented by a monkey named Jose. He was reportedly replaced by Coco the Elephant in 1960 when Mexican Americans complained about the ethnic stereotype. In 1963, the Hanna-Barbera character Snagglepuss took over as the mascot. Ogg the Caveman took over towards the end of 1967.

By the end of 1973, Tusk the Elephant became the mascot of the cereal, and he remained until the end of 1982, when Snap, Crackle and Pop (the mascots of Rice Krispies) replaced and retired Tusk the Elephant. In 1991, the mascot became Coco the Monkey. In 2001, Snap, Crackle, and Pop returned and they have remained the product's mascots to date. The cereal was introduced in the United Kingdom under the "Coco Pops" name in 1961, with Mr. Jinks as the mascot.

Later in the 1960s, Sweep (a dog hand puppet from the popular children's television programme The Sooty Show) became the mascot for Coco Pops. In 1963, Coco the Monkey was introduced, and he remains the mascot in those countries where the cereal is known as Coco Pops and Choco Pops, and some others named Choco Krispies. In recent years, the design of Coco has been refined to give him a younger look.

Late 2000s advertisements (2009) in the United Kingdom opted away from using Coco and his friends, instead opting for things such as dancing milkmen and astronauts. Coco is still present on the box of the cereal and at the end of the advertisement, but is no longer the featured character. However, the cereal box of 2009 has Coco's head as the main feature, with the title 'Coco Pops' and a smaller cereal bowl, on the right of the box. Briefly, Coco was seen as a real-life chimp. As of 2011, Kellogg's decided to bring Coco and his friends, as well as Croc back, initially under a space age style campaign, known as the "Coco Pops Promise".

In July 2014 in Mexico, due to concerns about the sugary and caloric contents of the cereal and the relation kids made with the friendly mascot, Melvin the elephant had a physical transformation from a traditional elephant body to an athletic body, resembling a strong teenager while keeping the head of the mascot. The cereal also had a recipe transformation to add more vitamins and minerals, in order to focus the product into a "health is fun" type of communication. Due to declining sales and inconsistent design Kellogg's with the agency Interbrand Mexico redesigned the character again on 2019 on his anniversary. In the United Kingdom and in Australia the mascot is Coco the Monkey.

In June 2020, after the murder of George Floyd and as Black Lives Matter demonstrations were taking place around the world, former UK Member of Parliament Fiona Onasanya criticized Kellogg's use of a monkey on the box of brown, chocolate-flavoured Coco Pops whereas Rice Krispies featured Snap, Crackle and Pop, three white characters. A spokesperson for Kellogg's responded that "We do not tolerate discrimination." Kellogg's also said that its founder, William Keith Kellogg, was "a pioneer in employing women in the workplace and reaching across cultural boundaries." Onasanya said that Kellogg's brother John Harvey Kellogg had founded the eugenics and racial hygiene organization Race Betterment Foundation. Kellogg's was previously criticized over racially insensitive imagery in 2017 when author Saladin Ahmed noticed that a Corn Pops cereal box's only dark-skinned character was a janitor cleaning the floor.

== Health ==
Coco Pops is given two (2.0) stars out of five on the Health Star Rating System of the Australian and New Zealand governments, primarily because of its high sugar content (listed as more than one-third sugar). In October 2009, Kellogg's was criticized by health authorities and consumer experts in the United States when it unveiled a description on its boxes of Cocoa Krispies cereal that stated: "now helps support your child's immunity". Kellogg's responded that it did not create the new copy to capitalize on concerns about the H1N1 virus, but added "Kellogg developed this product in response to consumers expressing a need for more positive nutrition".

Some observers, including Kelly Brownell, director of the Rudd Center for Food Policy and Obesity at Yale University, responded negatively to Kellogg's marketing campaign. There are concerns that advertisements target children. LCM bars of the type advertised contain 30% sugar, which the advertisement failed to note. Advertisements by bus stops asked "Ever thought of Coco Pops after school?" and parents in the UK expressed concern that children would want Coco Pops instead of healthier foods. Official support by Kellogg's for an anti-childhood obesity campaign has been seen as hypocritical.

== Advertising slogans ==
- "Just like a chocolate milkshake, only crunchy!" (Australia, New Zealand)
- "I'd rather have a bowl of Coco Pops!" (United Kingdom) (1986–2005; 2011–2015)
- "Coco Pops Crunchers – Can you handle the crunch?" (United Kingdom)
- "Ever thought of Coco Pops after school?" (United Kingdom) (2010)
- "Start the Magic with Coco Pops" (United Kingdom) (2021–present)

== Variations ==
Variations include Coco Pops Chocos, which is wheat cereal in the form of shells, similar to Nestlé's Chocapic, Coco Pops Jumbos, which is maize cereal in the form of balls, similarly to General Mills's Cocoa Puffs and Nestlé's Nesquik Cereal, and Coco Pops Rocks, which is similar to Jumbos, but also contains multi-grain "pillows" stuffed with chocolate cream, similarly to Krave, all of the aforementioned examples being chocolate-flavored.

In February 2022, Kellogg's released a 'mystery' flavor of Coco Pops, and ran a contest with a $10,000 AUD prize for guessing the flavor. The mystery flavor was revealed to be neapolitan ice cream, and Mystery Coco Pops were then relaunched as Coco Pops Vanilla Berry Choc Top.
