= Spinthariscope =

Device for observing individual nuclear disintegrations

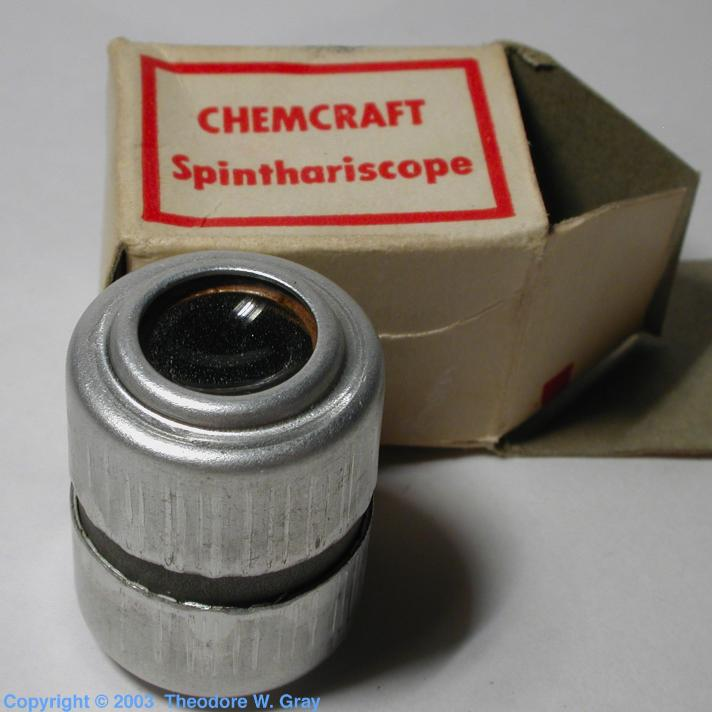
A low quality toy spinthariscope taken from a 1950s Chemcraft brand "Atomic energy" chemistry experimentation set

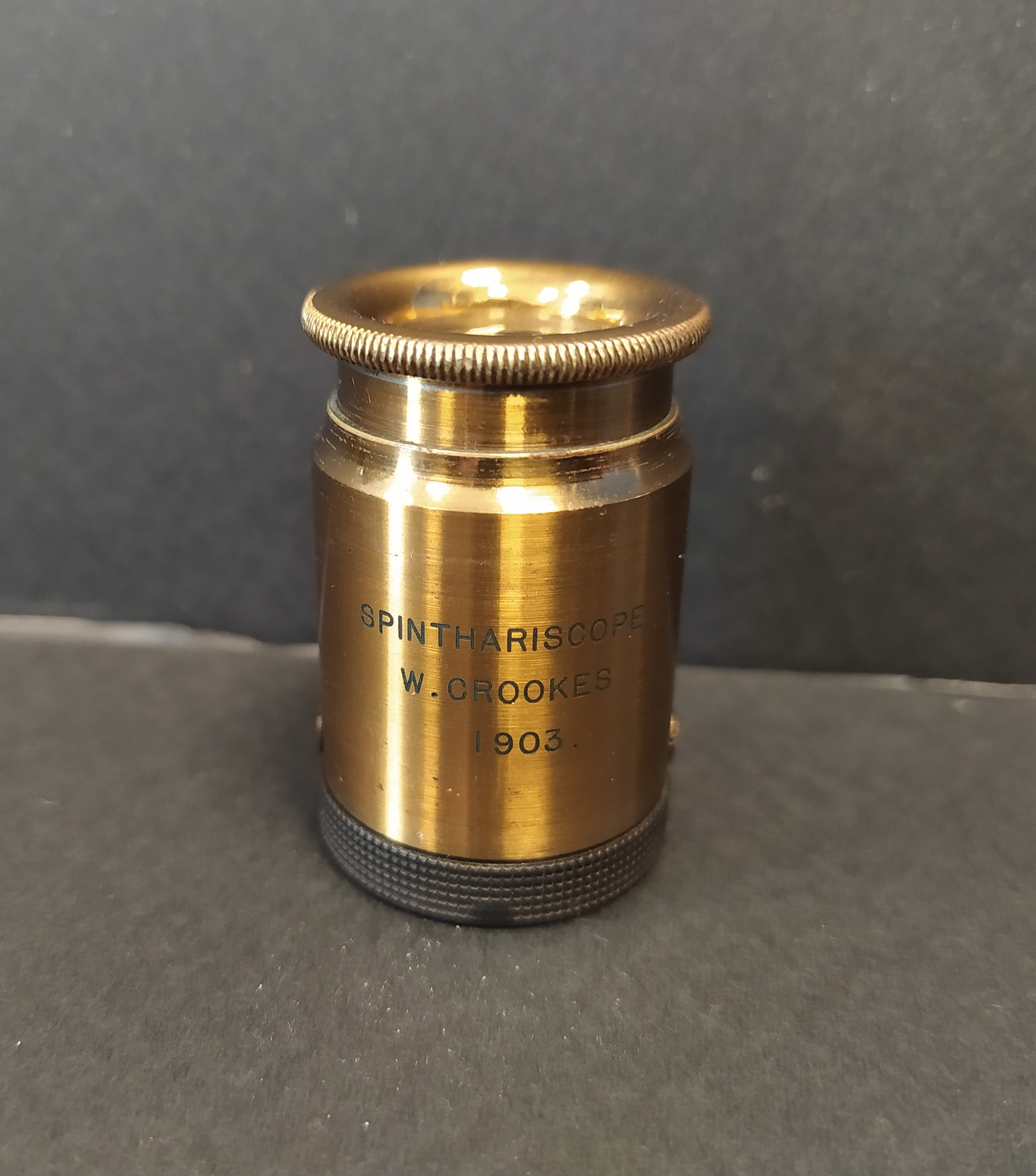
A spinthariscope crafted by Robert Drosten in Belgium in 1905 and used in the University of Mons Faculty of Engineering ("Polytech Mons") at the beginning of the 20th century.

A spinthariscope (/spɪnˈθærɪskoʊp/) is a device for observing individual nuclear disintegrations caused by the interaction of ionizing radiation with a phosphor (see radioluminescence) or scintillator.

== Invention ==
The spinthariscope was invented by William Crookes in 1903. While observing the apparently uniform fluorescence on a zinc sulfide screen created by the radioactive emissions (mostly alpha radiation) of a sample of radium bromide, he spilled some of the sample, and, owing to its extreme rarity and cost, he was eager to find and recover it. Upon inspecting the zinc sulfide screen under a microscope, he noticed separate flashes of light created by individual alpha particle collisions with the screen. Crookes took his discovery a step further and invented a device specifically intended to view these scintillations. It consisted of a small screen coated with zinc sulfide affixed to the end of a tube, with a tiny amount of radium salt suspended a short distance from the screen and a lens on the other end of the tube for viewing the screen. Crookes named his device from Ancient Greek: σπινθήρ (spinthḗr) "spark".

Crookes debuted the spinthariscope at a meeting of the Royal Society, London on 15 May 1903.

== Toy spinthariscopes ==
Spinthariscopes were quickly replaced with more accurate and quantitative devices for measuring radiation in scientific experiments, but enjoyed a modest revival in the mid 20th century as children's educational toys. In 1947, Kix cereal offered a Lone Ranger atomic bomb ring that contained a small one, in exchange for a box top and US$0.15 (equivalent to $2.16 in 2025). Spinthariscopes can still be bought today as instructional novelties, but they now use americium or thorium. Looking into a properly focused toy spinthariscope, one can see many flashes of light spread randomly across the screen. Almost all are circular, with a very bright pinpoint centre surrounded by a dimmer circle of emission.

== In museums ==
The American History Museum of the Smithsonian has several spinthariscopes in its collections, and an article discussing them. However, as of 2022 none are currently on display.
