= Cliffy the Clown =

American clown

Cliffy Sobier (June 25, 1891 - September 1, 1984), known professionally as Cliffy the Clown was an American clown beginning in 1949. The clown debuted on an ABC-TV show called Super Circus. The family oriented show aired on Sunday afternoons for an hour. Cliffy's sidekicks on the show were Scampy and Nicky, both clowns. Cliffy was the head of the group. He had a bald head, oversized shoes, and a red nose. Unfortunately, the TV series had to move to New York City in 1955, leaving Cliffy the clown both disheartened and unemployed.

Cliffy became the official mascot of Kellogg's Sugar Smacks in 1953. He served as the sweetened puffed wheat breakfast cereal's mascot until 1956, when replaced by a rival mascot named Smaxey, a seal dressed in a sailor suit.
