= Honey Monster Puffs =

British breakfast cereal made since 1957

- Product type: Breakfast cereal
- Current owner: Raisio Group
- Country: United Kingdom
- Introduced: 1957; 69 years ago
- Previous owners: Quaker Oats Company
- Ambassador: Honey Monster

Honey Monster Puffs is a breakfast cereal manufactured in the United Kingdom from puffed wheat sweetened with sugar and honey, fortified with vitamins and iron. The cereal was originally sold as Sugar Puffs, but was re-branded in 2014. It was labelled as Honey Monster Sugar Puffs for a time. The cereal is known for its Honey Monster mascot, a large, hairy, yellow creature introduced in 1976. Cereals using the Honey Monster brand are currently being distributed by the Quaker Oats Company in Central America and Puerto Rico.

== History ==
Sugar Puffs were first launched in 1957, with Jeremy the Bear the cereal's promotional character. Jeremy was a live European female brown bear. The cereal was invented by William Halliday Davies (1919–2009), production manager at the Quaker Oats mill in Southall. For many years they were made by the Quaker Oats Company, but in 2006 they were sold to Big Bear t/a Honey Monster Foods, based in Leicester.

In 2014, along with the name change from Sugar Puffs to Honey Monster Puffs, the cereal's recipe was changed to have 8% less sugar and 20% more honey, so that the total sugar content is now 29% by mass, and the honey content has increased from 3% to 3.6%.

In 2016, food manufacturer Brecks Company based near Selby, North Yorkshire took over production of Honey Monster Puffs under licence from Raisio Group.

In 2020, Honey Monster won the Lausanne Index Prize – Silver Award.

== Varieties ==
There have been a number of variations on the basic product during the 1990s and 2000s, including:

- Banana Puffs
- H's And M's
- Choco Puffs
- Honey Waffles
- Spooky Puffs
- Honeycomb Puffs
- Strawberry Puffs
- Snowy Puffs

== Advertising ==
The cereal's mascot is the Honey Monster, a large, hairy, yellow humanoid creature who was first seen on TV in 1976 in an advertisement created by John Webster of the advertising agency BMP. The advert focused around a nutritional message which was illustrated by the parent and child relationship of actor Henry McGee and the Honey Monster. The monster shouts "Tell them about the honey, mummy!" to which McGee responds "I'm not his mummy!". The monster then proceeds to destroy the set.

Between 1989 and 1991, "Sugar Puffs" advertisements featured the slogan "You'll Go Monster-Mad for the Honey". These advertisements portrayed children trying to get access to a packet of Sugar Puffs with someone or something then preventing them from getting the Sugar Puffs. The children would then cry "I Want My Honey" (the "honey" being dubbed on in the Honey Monster's voice). The child or children would then transform into the Honey Monster (normally bursting out of their clothes) and collecting the box of Sugar Puffs while the scene descended rapidly into chaos.

There were a number of settings for these advertisements. The advertisements themselves were:

- "Breakfast Time": A boy sneaks downstairs into the kitchen but the box of Sugar Puffs is on a high shelf and he cannot reach it.
- "School History Class": A class of bored children see a Sugar Puffs lorry park up outside their classroom.
- "Boyscouts": Three Boy Scouts are camping. They can see a box of Sugar Puffs on a table outside their tent but the zipper is jammed, trapping them inside.
- "Fairground": A girl is at a fairground and is trying to win a packet of Sugar Puffs from a hoop-throwing stall.
- ”Frozen/Tropical Island": A boy collects milk from his snow-covered doorstep but realises it has frozen so he cannot have his Sugar Puffs. In this scene after transforming he is fired into space and on to a tropical island where the milk is no longer frozen. (This was the only advert in this series where the Honey Monster was wearing new clothes in the final scenes).
- "Factory School Trip": A class of school children are taken on a tour of the Sugar Puffs Factory. During the tour they transform into Honey Monsters, climbing into the machinery and stealing boxes of Sugar Puffs.

The slogan "You’ll go monster-mad for the honey" which featured at the end of these adverts was read by actor Norman Lovett. To coincide with the adverts the packaging was amended to have an "I want my Honey" speech bubble coming from the Honey Monster's mouth.

After these advertisements, the Sugar Puffs Honey Monster was then seen in advertisements in which he was depicted playing football and also as a James Bond-style hero. Punk poet John Cooper Clarke also featured in a series of off the wall adverts in the 1990s. An advertisement showing the Honey Monster onstage with Boyzone at Wembley Arena aired in 1996, and was voted #17 in ITV's Best TV Ads Ever 2 list in 2006, sharing the position with the original 1976 advert. Another of the 1996 adverts showed him winning a football match. In 1998, an advert which depicted him as "Puff" Daddy aired. In 1999, an advert called "Monster Men vs Breakin' Boyz" aired. A modern style remake of the original 1976 advert aired in 2003.

In March 2008, a new campaign was launched with a television advertisement. The spot featured Honey Monster and his housemate sitting at their breakfast table, singing a nonsense song about Sugar Puffs, in the scat style. Finishing with the strapline 'Feed the fun', the advertisement represented the idea that Honey Monster brings out the child in everyone. The advert was criticised by Julian Barratt and Noel Fielding of the comedy duo The Mighty Boosh, who considered it to be a plagiarism of the "crimping" songs in their television series.

In August 2008 the Honey Monster featured in a charity video and single by the group Samanda, called "Honey Love". Another new advert was broadcast for the Honey Waffles cereal variant, returning the Honey Monster to his true self along with his undying love for honey. The ad ends with the tagline (as said by the Honey Monster) "Don't tell 'em about the honey, mummy", a reference to the Sugar Puffs endline from the 1970s.

== In popular culture ==
Sugar Puffs posters can clearly be seen in the 1966 film Daleks – Invasion Earth: 2150 A.D.. They helped to finance the film, and in return held a giveaway contest in which the grand prize was a Dalek prop made for the film.

Sugar Puffs were mentioned by Father Dougal McGuire during a debate on God’s plan for the world in the Father Ted episode “Cigarettes and Alcohol and Rollerblading”.

The Honey Monster mascot was used as part of a recurring gag in the film Four Lions; one of the main characters uses an outfit of the character as a disguise in the final act.

Paul Calf was frequently seen eating Sugar Puffs.

In the British science-fiction show Red Dwarf, Dave Lister is fond of Sugar Puff sandwiches.

In 2009, as part of Red Nose Day, Honey Monster appeared with many other advertising icons in a self-deprecating sketch called 'The Greatest Minds in Advertising'. As the punchline Honey Monster silences his colleagues by singing a song in falsetto (not his trademark deep voice) exhorting people not to buy advertised products but to give their money to Comic Relief instead.

In January 2013, John Wright in a blog for The Guardian newspaper made what he described as "a perfect breakfast beer" by using a block of stuck-together Sugar Puffs as one of its main ingredients.

The cereal features in the 2018 Interactive film Black Mirror: Bandersnatch.

As a result of Honey Monster appearing in a Sugar Puffs advert, wearing the kit of Newcastle United F.C., sales of Sugar Puffs fell by 20% in the north-east of England, as fans of Newcastle's traditional rivals, Sunderland A.F.C., boycotted the brand.

== Similar products ==
- Honey Smacks (also known as Smacks, Sugar Smacks, Honni Korn Smacks)
- Post's Golden Crisp
- Sanitarium's Honey Puffs
