= Nesquik (cereal) =

Breakfast cereal based on Nesquik

Nestlé Nesquik

- Product type: Breakfast cereal
- Current owner: Nestlé
- Produced by: Nestlé (Europe); General Mills (US & Canada)
- Country: Switzerland; United States
- Introduced: 1999; 27 years ago
- Website: nestle.com/nesquikcereal

Nesquik, also known as Nestlé Nesquik and Nesquik Cereal, is a family of breakfast cereals made by the Swiss company Nestlé, and based on the popular Nesquik product line. Nesquik is marketed by Cereal Partners under the Nestlé brand worldwide except in the US where it is marketed under the General Mills brand.

Nesquik Cereal was first introduced in the US in 1999. The cereal consists of small, 1 centimetre spheres of chocolate cereal. Nesquik Cereal is most similar to General Mills' Cocoa Puffs; it is also their most direct competitor. Nesquik Cereal is made with whole-grains and is thus a whole-grain cereal.

The cereal is currently available in 43 countries. In 2012, Nestlé discontinued its distribution of Nesquik Cereal from the US market for reasons unstated by the company. It is available in 30 grams, 375 grams, 590 grams, 700 grams package sizes. Most Nesquik Cereal is manufactured in France.

== Ingredients ==
Cereal grains (whole grain wheat, maize semolina, rice flour), sugar, cocoa powder, dextrose, palm oil, salt, fat-reduced cocoa powder, trisodium phosphate; flavouring: vanillin; vitamins and minerals: vitamin C, niacin, pantothenic acid (B5), vitamin (B6), riboflavin (B2), thiamin (B1), folic acid (folacin), vitamin B12, calcium carbonate and iron.

== Nutrition ==
Nutritional information for Nesquik Cereal per 100-gram serving:

- Energy: 379 kcal
- Protein: 7.3 grams
- Carbohydrates: 79.1 grams
- Sugar: 35 grams
- Fat: 3.8 grams
- Saturated fat: 1.6 grams
- Fibre: 5.1 grams
- Sodium: 0.2 grams

== Advertising ==
Nesquik Cereal typically advertised more aggressively in large markets. However, wherever it is marketed it is usually on children's television channels. Nesquik Cereal advertisements are heavily marketed towards children, though there have been several marketed to adults. Almost all of Nesquik Cereal ads are displayed via TV, and not the Internet or print. The ads directed towards children often depict an animal in a high energy state, as if it is having a sugar rush.

=== Cartoon Network partnership ===
In 2002, Nesquik Cereal signed a sponsorship deal with Cartoon Network which facilitated the creation of a Nesquik 'Tongue Twister' machine appearing with Quicky the Bunny in television advertising campaigns.

== See also ==
- Nesquik
- Chocapic
- Lion Cereal
