= Golden Crisp =

Breakfast cereal made by Post Cereals

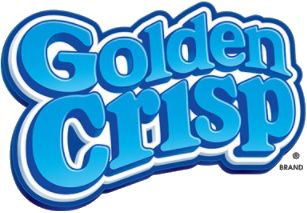

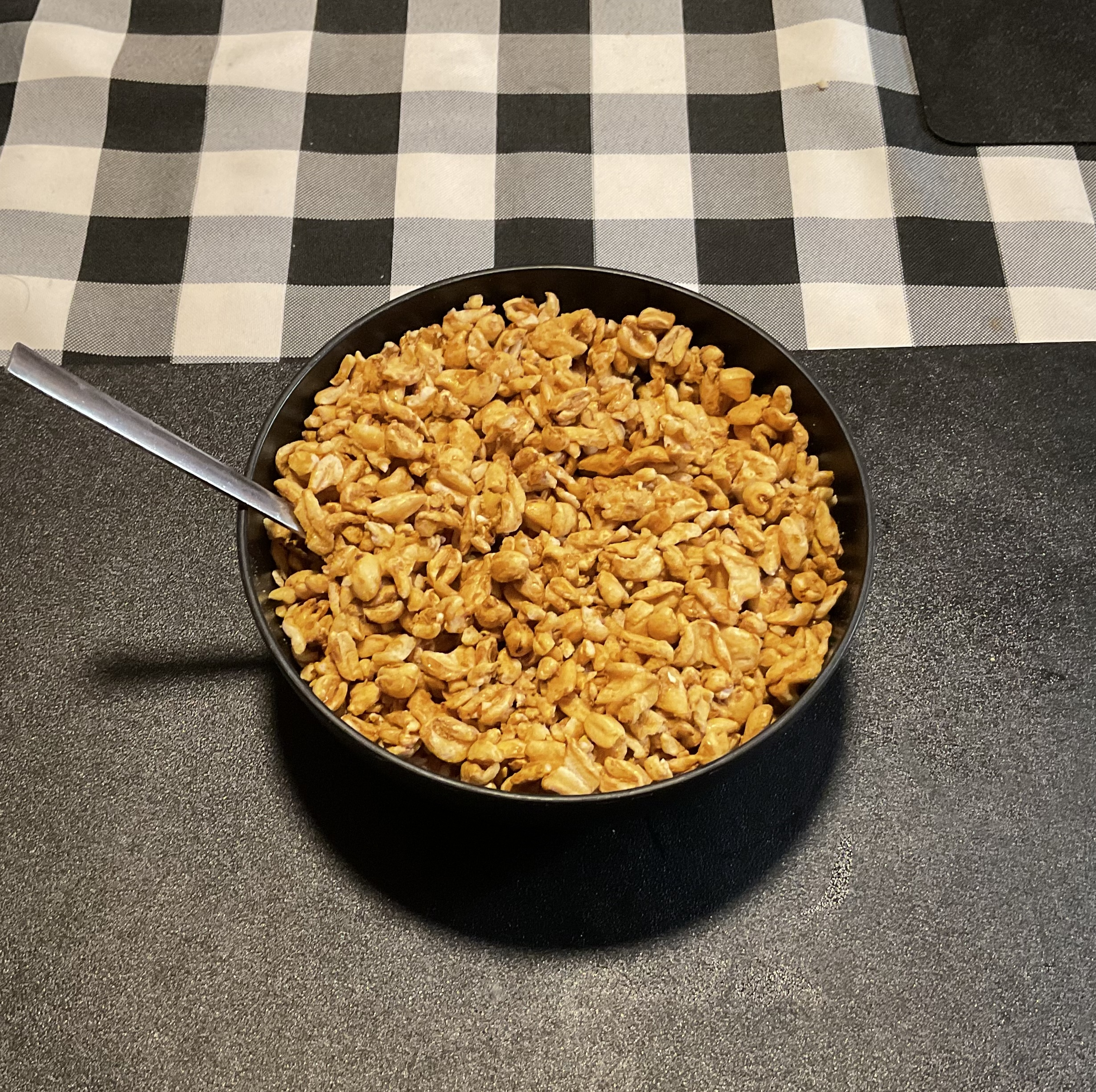
- Golden Crisp – Sweetened Puffed Wheat Cereal, in a bowl with a spoon
- Product type: Breakfast cereal
- Current owner: Post Holdings
- Produced by: Post Consumer Brands
- Country: U.S.
- Introduced: 1948; 78 years ago (as "Happy Jax")
- Related brands: Sugar Crisp (Canada); Honey Smacks
- Website: www.goldencrisp.com

Golden Crisp, also known as Sugar Crisp in Canada, is a brand of breakfast cereal made by Post Consumer Brands that consists of sweetened, candy-coated puffed wheat and is noted for its high sugar content. It was introduced in the United States in 1948.

== History ==
At the 1904 World's Fair, the Quaker Oats Company made a candy-coated puffed cereal, a wheat-based product similar to Cracker Jack's candy-coated popcorn. The product concept was re-introduced unsuccessfully in 1939 by another business as Ranger Joe, the first pre-sweetened, candy-coated breakfast cereal. Post Foods introduced their own version in 1948. The Post version was originally called "Happy Jax", and was renamed to "Sugar Crisp" the next year.

Sugar Crisp debuted with what The Oxford Companion to Sugar and Sweets would later call "an astonishing sugar content of 51 percent" (in weight), which remained the second highest in the US market when competitor Kellogg's introduced its Sugar Smacks (later renamed Honey Smacks) in the early 1950s which consisted of 55% sugar. The two cereals are both sweetened puffed wheat.

In 1967, the name was changed to "Super Sugar Crisp", and in 1985, it was changed again to "Super Golden Crisp". Finally, it was changed to "Golden Crisp" (during a time when many cereals dropped the word "Sugar" from their names) in the American market.

In the early 1970s, there was a short-lived variation on the original Sugar Crisp, called "Super Orange Crisp", which had orange-flavored O's in it.

As of 2026, the product is still sold as Sugar Crisp in Canada, with ads displaying the Sugar Bear mascot and the phrase "Can't get enough of that Sugar Crisp."

== Marketing ==
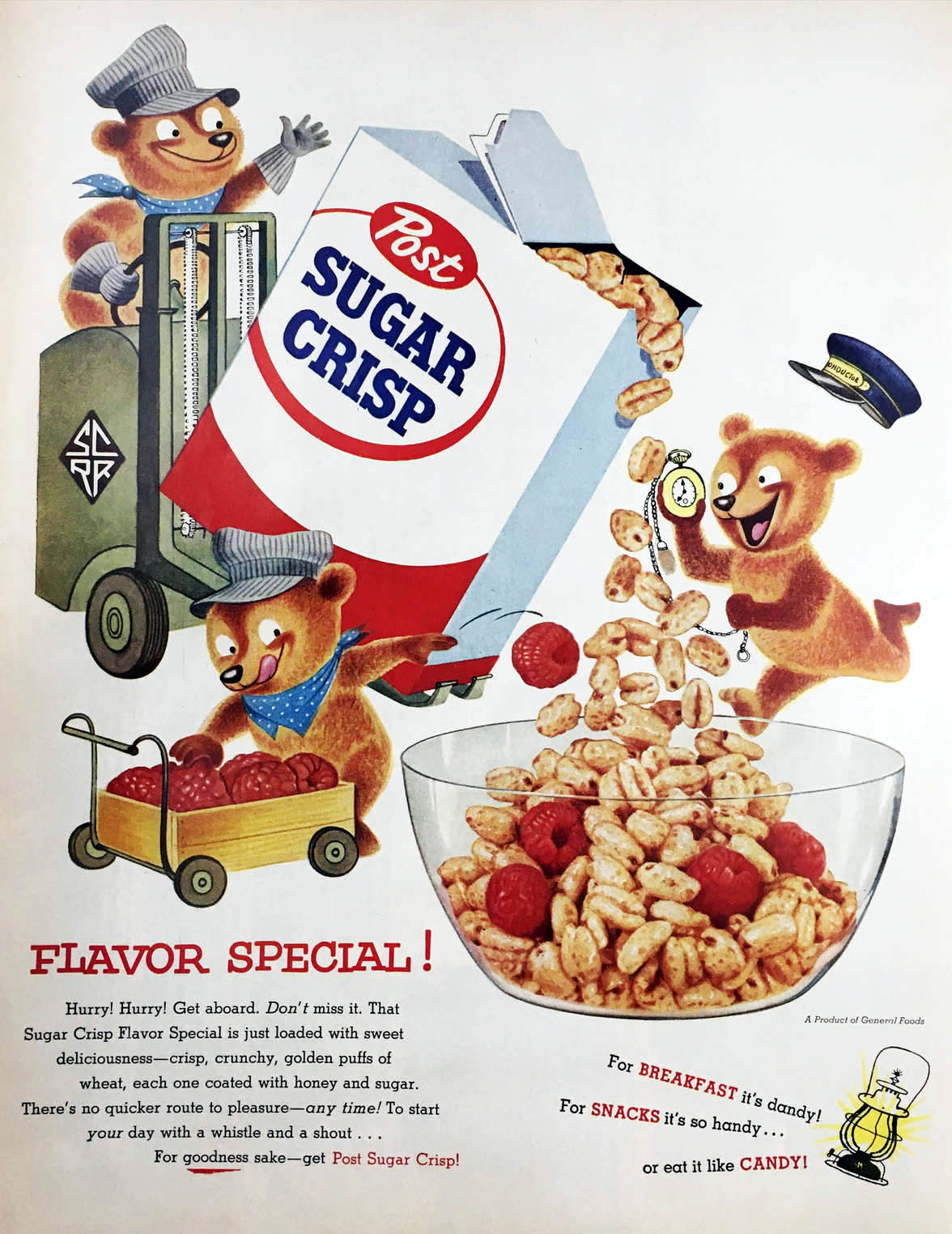
1955 advertisement, stating the "sugar crisp" was appropriate for breakfast, snack, or candy

Advertisements in the 1950s positioned this sugar cereal as being appropriate to eat for breakfast, as a snack, or as candy, similar to candy-coated popcorn products like Cracker Jack. Early advertisements featured three animated cartoon bears named Dandy, Handy, and Candy as the mascots. The early slogan said, "As a cereal it's dandy—for snacks it's so handy—or eat it like candy!"

Later television advertisements feature one mascot, an anthropomorphic cartoon bear character known as Sugar Bear, who sings the jingle, "Can't get enough of that Sugar Crisp", to the tune of Joshua Fit the Battle of Jericho. In commercials, Sugar Bear could turn into "Super Bear" upon eating it. This was dropped in the mid-to-late 1980s, where he would simply defeat his foes with a "vitamin-packed punch" as Sugar Bear. The jingle was also expanded to conclude with "it's got the crunch with punch", although this was dropped in later years. In later lines of commercials (the first listed produced exclusively for Canada), Sugar Bear would do battle with Stan, a security guard at the Sugar Crisp factory (from whom Sugar Bear would try to steal mass amounts of Sugar Crisp straight from the factory, often swimming in the honey used to sweeten it with the phrase "how sweet it is!"), or (one of the earliest and longest running of his co-stars) Granny, an elderly witch-like figure with a magic wand (voiced by Ruth Buzzi and later by June Foray) who, despite liberal use of magic, could never keep Sugar Bear from helping himself to her Golden Crisp. Sugar Bear's voice, provided by Gerry Matthews for forty years, was in the style of a suave crooner like Bing Crosby or Dean Martin.

The focus of advertising shifted from targeting children to including parents, by downplaying the sweet taste (and associated sugar content).

== Concerns over sugar content ==
In 1975, Super Orange Crisp was found to contain almost 71 percent sugar by dentist Ira Shannon. Shannon, who became tired of seeing so many cavities in his patients' mouths, bought hundreds of different kinds of sugary breakfast cereals and analyzed the contents of each in a lab.

In a 2008 comparison of the nutritional value of 27 cereals, U.S. magazine Consumer Reports found that Post's Golden Crisp and the similar Kellogg's Honey Smacks were the two brands with the highest sugar content—more than 50 percent (by weight)—commenting that one serving of this or other high-sugar cereals contained at least as much sugar "as there is in a glazed doughnut from Dunkin' Donuts". Consumer Reports recommended that parents choose cereal brands with better nutritional ratings for their children.

== See also ==
- Honey Smacks
- Honey Monster Puffs
- Sanitarium's Honey Puffs
