= Lion (chocolate bar) =

Chocolate bar

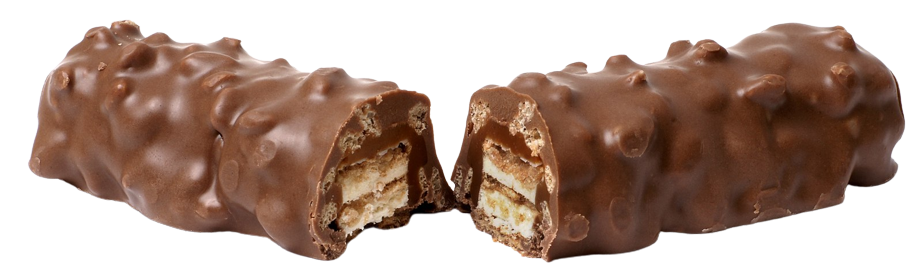
- Product type: Chocolate bar
- Current owner: Nestlé
- Country: United Kingdom
- Introduced: 1976; 50 years ago
- Related brands: Lion Cereal
- Previous owners: Rowntree's
- Website: nestle.co.uk/lionbar

Lion is a brand of chocolate bar currently owned and manufactured by Nestlé. The brand was originally introduced by British company Rowntree's in 1976. It consists of a filled wafer with caramel and cereals covered in milk chocolate.

== History ==
Lion was first launched by Yorkshire confectionery company Rowntree's in Fawdon, Newcastle in 1976. The production of Lion bars was moved to a factory in Dijon, France when it was bought by Swiss company Nestlé in 1988.

=== 2004–2007 ===
In 2004, Nestlé invested £6.7 million in the relaunching of the chocolate bar across Europe in countries such as the United Kingdom, France and Germany. The campaign was suited to the target market of teenage boys which differed from Lion bar's traditional target market of 18 to 34-year-old males. As part of the campaign Nestlé and TV channel Animal Planet launched a co-branded in-store promotion in 2000 stores in the United Kingdom. The promotion included sampling designed to reach more than one million customers, as well as a TV campaign. The sampling team gave away more than 650,000 Lion bars at ten shopping centres and 20 town centre locations. Nestle brand manager David Hardwick said that following Nestle research the chocolate bar was made lighter and milkier and the caramel was made softer. The size of the wafer was also reduced and more cream and crispy bits were added. Hardwick stated that the only thing that had not changed was the recipe for the wafer.

Nestlé reduced the amount of transfat in Lion bars to meet a growing consumer trend for smaller portions and healthier eating but sales fell by 18% between 2004 and 2005. In addition, total volumes declined from 30,000 tonnes to 18,000 tonnes between 2002 and 2007 and by around 50% over the span of 10 years. In 2007, Nestlé sold its factory in Dijon to Barry Callebaut with Nestlé saying it will outsource the production to the chocolate producer who can use the existing capacity and equipment to manufacture some of its own products.

=== 2017–present ===
On 20 July 2017, a lorry containing twenty-five tons of Lion bars burst into flames on the A2 road, near the junction for the Bluewater shopping centre in Kent. The fire caused traffic disruption and three of the four London-bound lanes were closed. The Kent Fire and Rescue Service said the cause of the blaze was not known and Nestlé said that the driver of the lorry was not injured.

A peanut version of Lion, branded as the "Wild Peanut Lion Bar", was introduced in October 2021. It was available exclusively in B&M for the remainder of 2021 before launching in other retailers in 2022.

== Lion Cereal ==
Lion Cereal

Nestlé produce a spin-off breakfast cereal called "Lion Cereal" which is described as “the King of Cereals” and contains chocolate, caramel and whole grain to make it taste like the Lion chocolate bar.

In a 2004 analysis by the Consumers' Association, researchers named it the worst and most unhealthy cereal in the survey. It was found that the cereal contained 35.9 grams of sugar per 100 grams which was 18 times the recommended level of sugar with researchers saying that Nestle Lion Cereal contained as much sugar as the chocolate bar of the same name. It was also found that the cereal contained four times as much fat than recommended at 13.7 grams as well as 0.75g salt. In 2016, researchers from the World Action on Salt and Health reported that Nestle's Lion cereal contained over two teaspoons of sugar per serving at 29 grams of sugar per 100 grams which in the survey placed the cereal only behind Frosties, Coco Pops and Crunchy Nut Cornflakes in terms of sugar.

In January 2020, Nestlé developed a perfume based on the breakfast cereal called Eau de Lion which was produced in a limited edition run of 300 bottles in France. In March 2021, Lion Cereal and Mother announced their advertising campaign called "King of the Jingle" which aimed to create a jingle for the brand. Participants had from 23 August 2021 until 2 October 2021 to enter and the eleven winners were selected by Hatik, Bilal Hassani, Ogee and Lou.

Lion cereal is sold in Greece.

== See also ==
- List of Nestlé brands
