= Sugar Bear =

- Voiced by: Gerry Matthews

In-universe information
- Species: Bear
- Gender: Male
- Occupation: Mascot of Golden Crisp

Sugar Bear is the advertising cartoon mascot of Post Super Sugar Crisp (later Golden Crisp) cereal.

== History ==
Sugar Bear originally appeared in the 1940s as the mascot of Sugar Crisp (later known as Golden Crisp), a cereal produced by General Foods Corporation under the Post brand. The original bear was designed by Robert "Bob" Irwin, a graphic designer for Post Cereal and voiced, in animated commercials, for 40 years by Gerry Matthews in emulation of a Bing Crosby or Dean Martin persona – a shallow-eyed, easy going character who crooned his cereal's praises to the tune of "Joshua Fit the Battle of Jericho".

He was made a character in the 1964 Saturday morning cartoon Linus the Lionhearted. Most of the characters in the series, sponsored by General Foods, were mascots for Post cereal products (permitted at that time, later banned by the American Federal Trade Commission (FTC)).

Sugar Bear normally wore a blue turtleneck sweater with his name on the front, and in the 1980s a bite of Super Sugar Crisp would turn him into the muscular "Super Bear" (this alter ego was used to fight monsters who would steal the cereal). Several commercials in the mid 1980s had him using mere casual gestures to outsmart the aggressive tendencies of other animals. Examples include 1987 spots featuring Sugar Bear riding an elephant into a jungle of feisty tigers, playing matador to a raging bull, and sparring with irate sharks of the ocean.

His consistent nemesis was an elderly woman called Granny Goodwitch (voiced by Laugh-In's Ruth Buzzi), with whom he engaged in elaborate contests, often involving trickery, magic, and high technology to decide who got a box of the cereal. In the end, Granny Goodwitch was never angry with Sugar Bear. Other nemeses included Blob, whose breakfast included pickles and soda; and Sugar Fox, who always tried and failed to keep Sugar Bear from getting his box of Super Sugar Crisp.

The Sugar Bear character was popular enough to have occasional premium toys. A yo-yo and padlock were produced in the 1960s, and even in 1993, a Christmas ornament saw him dressed as Santa Claus. Miniature talking plush dolls were also released in the early 1990s. Most recently, a Wacky Wobbler was released by Funko Inc.

Sugar Bear is being illustrated for the box covers by commercial illustrator Seymour Schachter.

== Musical group ==
In 1971, producer Jimmy Bowen, singers Kim Carnes and Errol Sober, songwriters Baker Knight, Mike Settle, and others created a bubblegum pop studio group named the Sugar Bears. A cardboard cut-out record was produced and printed on the back of thousands of Super Sugar Crisp cereal boxes. The illustrated record identified four members: Sugar Bear, Honey Bear, Shoobee Bear, and Doobee Bear. Five different versions of the record were printed, each with one of five songs shown on the label. A commercial album, Presenting the Sugar Bears, and three singles were released by Big Tree Records with one song, "You Are the One", reaching No. 51 on the Billboard charts.
