= Chocos =

Breakfast cereal manufactured by Kellogg's

- Product type: Breakfast cereal
- Current owner: Kellogg Company
- Country: India
- Related brands: Chocapic
- Markets: India
- Website: kelloggs.in/chocos

Chocos is a breakfast cereal manufactured by Kellogg's and sold in various European and South Asian countries. They are usually chocolate-flavored and shaped in 'scoops', but also come in other flavors and shapes.

It is especially popular in India. The mascot was Choco the Bear until 2005 when he was replaced by Coco the Monkey, who is also the mascot of Cocoa Krispies.

The cereal is similar to Chocapic, and often promotes well-known fictional characters, such as Spider-Man.
