= Cruncheroos =

Breakfast cereal made by Kellogg's

- Product type: Breakfast cereal
- Current owner: Kellogg's
- Country: Canada
- Introduced: 1990; 36 years ago

Cruncheroos is a whole grain oat breakfast cereal manufactured by Kellogg's, originally available in Canada in two flavors, apple and cinnamon or honey and almonds. As the name states, the cereal was crunchy and O-shaped.

The cereal was created in the early 1990s and featured a mascot named "Crunchosaurus Rex", an anthropomorphic purple dinosaur wearing a yellow sweater who, in television advertisements, used stealth and cunning to steal the cereal from another character who was consuming it, such as a hungry museum guard working late at night.
