= Trix (cereal) =

Breakfast cereal made by General Mills

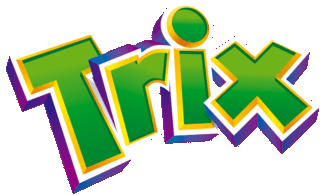

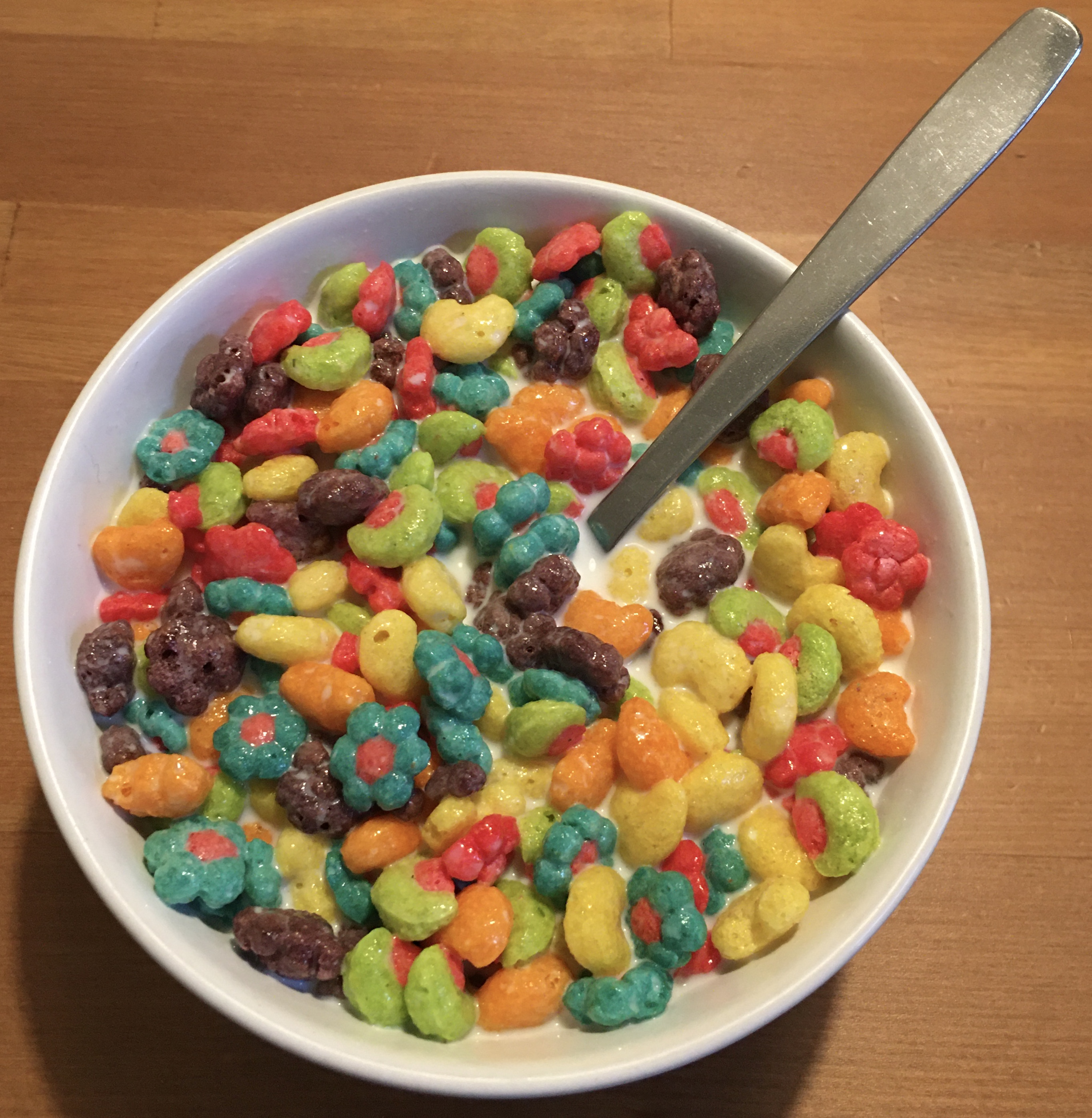
- Trix – Naturally and Artificially Fruit Flavored Sweetened Corn Puffs, with milk
- Product type: Breakfast cereal
- Current owner: General Mills
- Produced by: General Mills (US); Nestlé (outside US)
- Country: United States
- Introduced: May 1, 1954; 72 years ago
- Related brands: Kix
- Markets: Global
- Website: generalmills.com/trix

Trix is an American brand of breakfast cereal made by General Mills of Minneapolis, Minnesota, for the North American market and by Cereal Partners (using the Nestlé brand) elsewhere in the world. The cereal consists of fruit-flavored, sweetened, ground-corn pieces.

The Trix trademark is also used by Yoplait (a yogurt company previously mostly owned by General Mills) for a line of similarly flavored yogurt marketed toward children.

== History ==
General Mills introduced Trix in 1954 as a sugar-coated version of its popular Kix cereal. The original Trix cereal was composed of more than 46% sugar and included three colors: "Orangey Orange" (formerly named Orange Orange), "Lemony Yellow" (formerly named Lemon Yellow), and "Raspberry Red". Five fruit shapes and colors were added over the years: "Grapity (or Grapey) Purple" (1984–present), "Lime Green" (1991–1998, 2007–2015, 2017–present), "Wildberry Blue" (1997–2007, 2018–present), "Berry Blue" (2007–2015, 2017–present), and "Watermelon" (1998–2007, 2018–present). In 1991 and again in 1995, the cereal pieces were given a brighter, more colorful look. General Mills' Yoplait division produces a Trix-branded yogurt marketed to children with sweetened fruit flavors such as "Watermelon Burst". Later, Trix Swirls were introduced, with flavors such as "Rasp-orangey orange swirl" (a mix of the Orangey orange and Raspberry red flavors). A new flavor, "Wildberry Red Swirl", was introduced in 2011. Trix Swirls have since been discontinued, and the pieces in the original Trix were changed to their original 2007 flavor and shape lineup in 2014.

The cereal originally used spherical cereal pieces, but in 1991 these were changed to puffed fruit-shaped pieces, presumably to avoid clashing with Berry Berry Kix when it was introduced in 1992. In 2007, Trix reverted to their original shapes in the United States, much to fans' dismay. Mexico was the only country to maintain fruit-shaped pieces until around late 2018, when they were reintroduced globally.

In 2015, General Mills announced it would no longer use artificial colors in its cereals, and Trix would be among the first to change. Trix would go from six colors to four because satisfactory natural alternatives were found for orange, yellow, red, and purple, but not blue or green.

On September 21, 2017, General Mills announced that the six-color version of Trix cereal would be reintroduced back to the market, and that artificial dyes and flavors would be utilized to do so after customers complained about the naturally-flavored Trix. The four-color, non-artificial-dye/flavor version would continue to be sold. In that same announcement, General Mills said they would revert to the puffed fruit-shaped pieces, which happened around late 2018.

== Marketing and advertising ==
The 1959 Trix commercial featuring "Silly Rabbit"

By 1955, just one year after Trix's market debut, General Mills experimented with a rabbit puppet as a potential Trix mascot. Joe Harris, a copywriter and illustrator at the Dancer Fitzgerald Sample advertising agency, created the trademark animated "Silly Rabbit", who debuted in a 1959 television commercial for the cereal. Harris also wrote the famous Trix tagline, "Silly rabbit, Trix are for kids!", which is still used in General Mills' commercial campaigns. It is also used at the end of every commercial: children state to the rabbit that the cereal itself is for them only.

Chet Stover, creative director of the Trix account at Dancer Fitzgerald Sample, fully credited Harris with the creation of the Trix rabbit after viewing the new character in its 1959 television commercial for the cereal. In an internal memo to Dancer Fitzgerald Sample employees, Stover wrote, "In a business where the only thing we have to sell are ideas, it is of first importance the credit is given where credit belongs — and Joe gets all the credit for this one."

The Trix Rabbit—voiced by Mort Marshall in earlier commercials, and by Russell Horton in later commercials—is an anthropomorphic cartoon rabbit who finds children and wants to trick the children into giving him a bowl of cereal. He bursts with enthusiasm but is discovered every time. The kids always reprimand him with the signature phrase: "Silly rabbit, Trix are for kids!" at the end of the commercials. These ads in the late 1960s and early 1970s sometimes closed with the Trix Rabbit following up with "And sometimes for tricky rabbits!" (This happened in case he managed to have a taste or he had a secret stash.) The Trix Rabbit originated as a puppet before he was animated. The plight of the Trix Rabbit has drawn comparisons to Sisyphus, a Greek figure who was doomed to endlessly repeat a futile task. He did succeed in obtaining and eating Trix cereal on occasion, including five times as the result of a box top mail-in contest (1968, 1976, 1980, 1984, and 1991) titled "Let The Rabbit Eat Trix". The results of the vote were overwhelmingly "yes", and the Trix Rabbit was depicted in a subsequent commercial enjoying a bowl of Trix. Children who voted received a button based upon their vote in the election. In 1991, the Trix Rabbit won a Tour de Trix Bicycle Race. At the end of the race, two judges are arguing about whether or not the Trix Rabbit should get the prize. To decide the fate of the prize, the children are called upon to send in their votes. The result was yes and the Trix Rabbit got the prize, much to his delight.

In commercials from 1967, the 1970s, and the 1980s, the Trix Rabbit disguised himself to get the cereal, employing costumes as diverse as a balloon vendor, a painter and an American Indian. One alternate slogan for the cereal was, "Oranges, Lemons, and Grapes I see; the fruit taste of Trix is all for me!". Once, Bugs Bunny helped the Trix Rabbit in an attempt to get the cereal.

The Trix Rabbit's popularity led him to appear in commercials for other products, such as a Got Milk? advertisement, in which he disguises himself as a man (played by Harland Williams) taking Trix from a grocery store but realizing he is out of milk, much to his distress.

== See also ==
- List of breakfast cereal advertising characters
- List of breakfast cereals
