= Honey Puffs =

New Zealand breakfast cereal

- A box of Honey Puffs
- Type: Breakfast cereal
- Place of origin: New Zealand
- Created by: Sanitarium Health and Wellbeing Company

Honey Puffs (formerly sold in Australia under the name Honey Weets) is a breakfast cereal produced by Sanitarium Health and Wellbeing Company and formerly sold in New Zealand and Australia. It is made by puffing pieces of wheat and lightly coating them all over with honey.

On 27 March 2024 it was announced that Sanitarium will discontinue Honey Puffs by June 2025.

== Packaging ==
The box features a 3D bee in a red cap and red shoes skating away from the cereal bowl on blue ramp. It is printed on the box that Honey Puffs are made with real honey, don't have any artificial colours or flavours, are nut free for children and are 99% fat-free. The back of the box tells you how to play Sticky Stucky and features the same bee from the front, two bees wearing blue shoes and a bee wearing green shoes all flying around. There are also three bees hiding in between two flowers somehow growing in the hive.

== History ==
In 2003, Honey Puffs was the only cereal out of nearly two hundred that was judged as "okay" by The Australian Consumers Association, based on nutritional value.

New Zealand television show Studio 2 Live once held "The Honey Puffs Mad Movie Challenge". Competition entries made a short movie including a bee character and a box of Honey Puffs.

On 27 March 2024 it was announced that Sanitarium will discontinue Honey Puffs and several other cereals by June 2025. The other Sanitarium cereals being discontinued are Cluster Crisp, Granola, Light 'n' Tasty, Muesli, Weet-Bix Clusters, Weeties and Puffed Wheat. They will be discontinued as sales of these products are declining, and make up less than 10% of Sanitarium's sales.
