= Cocoa Puffs =

Breakfast cereal made by General Mills

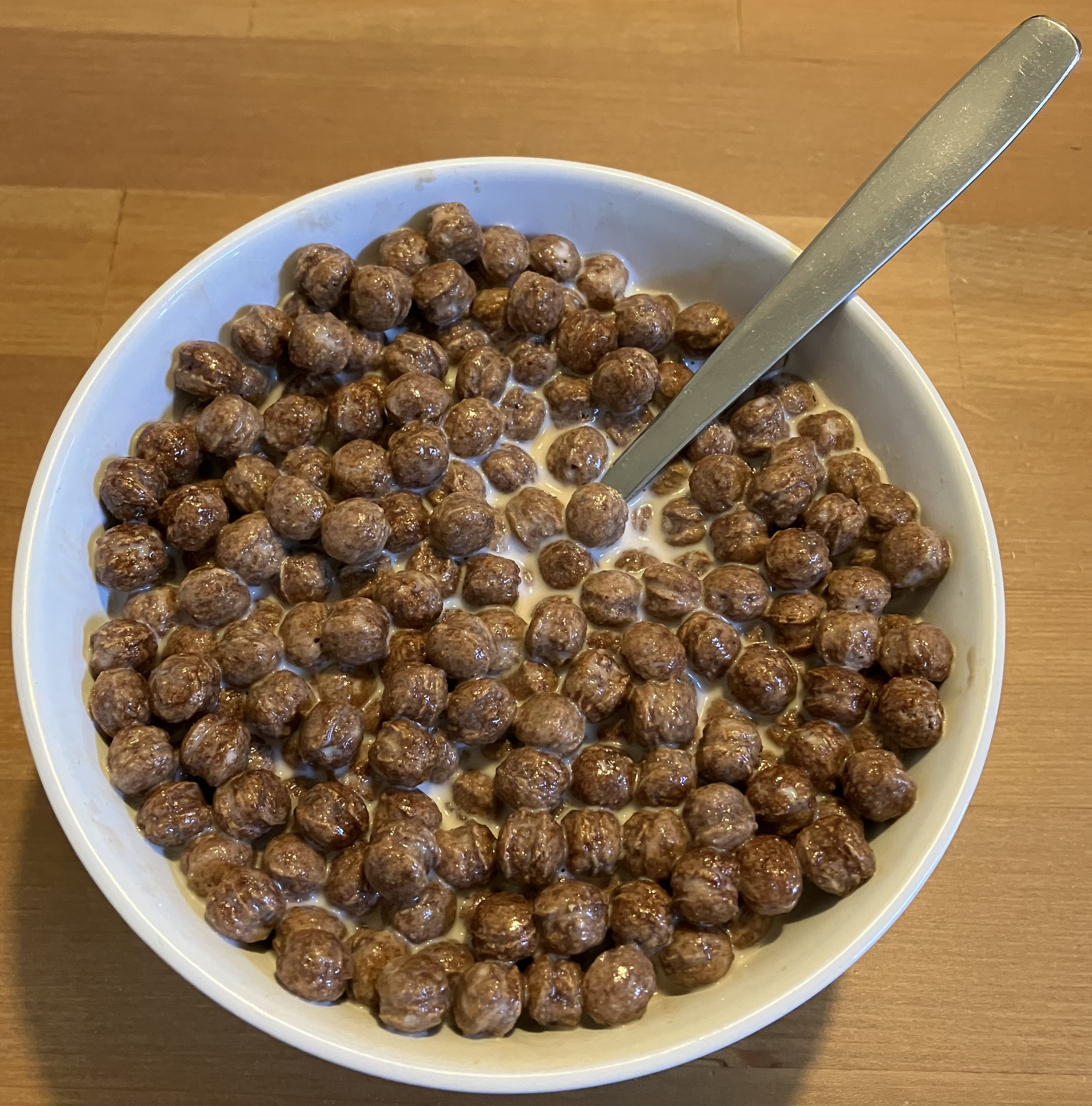
- General Mills Cocoa Puffs – Naturally Flavored Frosted Corn Puffs, with milk
- Product type: Breakfast cereal
- Current owner: General Mills
- Country: United States
- Introduced: 1956; 70 years ago
- Markets: US, Canada, Latin America, and Europe

Cocoa Puffs is an American brand of chocolate-flavored puffed grain breakfast cereal, manufactured by General Mills. Introduced in 1956, the cereal consists of small orbs of corn and rice flavored with cocoa.

Cocoa Puffs are sold in Canada, Latin America, and Europe under the Nesquik brand, via the Cereal Partners Worldwide agreement between Nestlé and General Mills.

== Ingredients ==
On several occasions, the cereal used Hershey's cocoa in its recipe, and this aspect was promoted in Cocoa Puffs boxes and commercials.

In December 2009, General Mills announced that it would cut the sugar in 10 kinds of cereal, including Cocoa Puffs, to less than 10 grams (0.35 oz) per serving. This could represent a 25% decline in the sugar content from the original level and 18% from the 2009 level of 11 grams (0.39 oz) per serving. A lower sugar version of Cocoa Puffs has also been sold, to be used for sugar-conscious youth-serving institutions such as schools. Provided in individual-portion packaging, their labels indicated 25% less sugar than regular Cocoa Puffs.

Cocoa Puffs Box

In 2020, General Mills brought back the retro recipes for four ready-to-eat cereals: Cocoa Puffs, Golden Grahams, Cookie Crisp, and Trix, saying, "Cocoa Puffs now delivers more chocolatey taste".

=== Legal issues ===
In August 2000, two class-action lawsuits were filed alleging that Cocoa Puffs cereal contains elevated levels of lead. The complaints, seeking $5 million in damages, cite a recent study by George Washington University researchers that found lead in 43% of 72 consumer cocoa products analyzed. The study, conducted over eight years, identified lead levels exceeding established guidelines in many products. These findings align with a 2023 Consumer Reports analysis that detected high levels of lead or cadmium in 16 of 48 tested chocolate products.

== Flavors and variants ==
A cereal bar of Cocoa Puffs has been made. A layer of dried, sweetened condensed milk is added to the bottom and marketed as a substitute for a bowl of milk and cereal.

In the summer of 2008, a new addition was introduced: Cocoa Puffs Combos, which consists of the recognizable chocolate puffs combined with vanilla puffs.

Besides Cocoa Puffs Combos, there are varieties of popular cereals. One such example was Cocoa Puffs Brownie Crunch in 2011. The front of the box described that cereal as "naturally and artificially flavored sweetened chocolate squares".

== Advertising ==
Earliest known TV appearance of Sonny

The mascot for Cocoa Puffs is Sonny, an orange anthropomorphic Cuckoo bird. He was introduced in 1963. In most commercials, Sonny attempts to resist Cocoa Puffs — his favorite cereal. However, after being reminded of the deliciousness of the cereal (generally described by the adjectives "munchy", "crunchy", and "chocolatey"), he capitulates in a burst of energy, exclaiming his catchphrase "I'm cuckoo for Cocoa Puffs!" and grabbing the cereal, usually also destroying wherever Sonny is in a given commercial. Sonny was voiced by Chuck McCann from 1963 to 1978, and has been voiced by Larry Kenney since 1978.

The line "cuckoo for Cocoa Puffs" has entered the vernacular as a term for somebody who acts irrationally.

Sonny's name comes from the original format of the commercials. In those, he was paired with another cuckoo, "Gramps", his grandfather (also voiced by McCann). When the grandfather was dropped from the ads, "Sonny" remained the character's name. In 2010, Gramps returned to the Cocoa Puffs ads, with McCann reprising his role as Gramps and Kenney continuing to voice Sonny.

Sonny was designed by Gene Cleaves and originally drawn by Bill Tollis. Animation pioneer "Grim" Natwick (of Fleischers' Betty Boop team) also contributed to the early images of Sonny and Gramps, according to then-contemporaries who collaborated with Natwick.

Sonny was initially depicted as wearing a pink-and-white striped shirt. In 1995, he was redesigned, this time wearing 1990s "extreme" clothes and being given a more Disney-like appearance. In 2004, he was redesigned more simplistically, this time without clothing.
