= Breakfast cereal =

Processed food made from grain

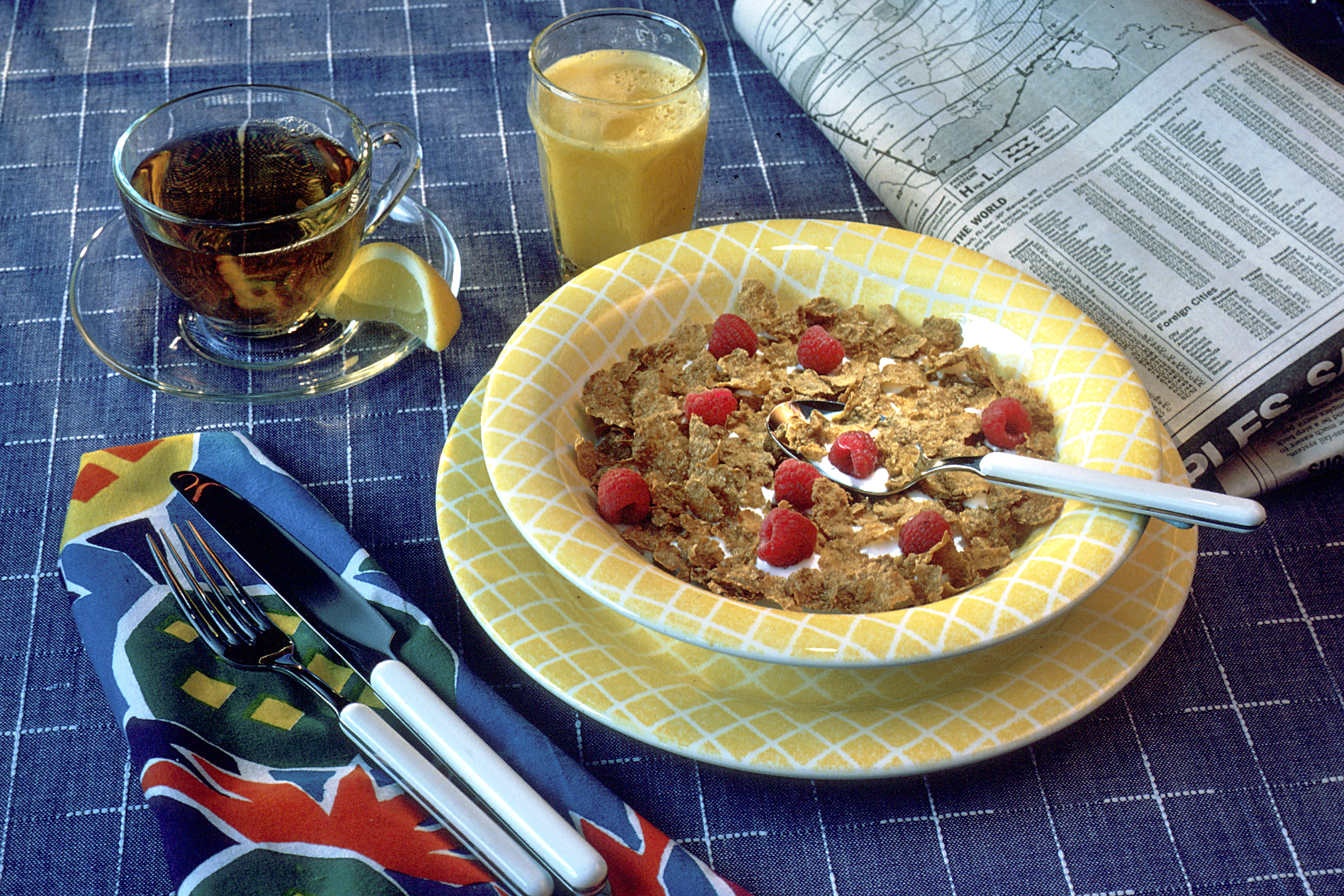
Additional nutrition is provided to flaked breakfast cereal by serving it in milk, topping it with fresh fruit such as raspberries, and including beverages like tea and orange juice.

Breakfast cereal is a category of food, including food products, made from processed cereal grains, that are eaten as part of breakfast or as a snack food, primarily in Western societies.

Although warm, cooked cereals like oatmeal, maize, grits, and wheat farina have the longest history as traditional breakfast foods, branded and ready-to-eat cold cereals (many produced via the process of extrusion) appeared around the late 19th century. These processed, precooked, packaged cereals are most often served in a quick and simple preparation with dairy products, traditionally cow's milk. These modern cereals can also be paired with yoghurt or plant-based milks, or eaten plain. Fruit or nuts are sometimes added, and may enhance the nutritional benefits.

Some companies promote their products for the health benefits that come from eating oat-based and high-fiber cereals. In the United States, cereals are often fortified with vitamins, but can still lack many of the vitamins needed for a healthful breakfast, and so initial marketing focused on making the new products "part of a complete breakfast". A significant proportion of packaged cereals have a high sugar content ("sugar cereals" or even "kids' cereals" in common parlance). These cereals are frequently marketed toward children (in television ads, comic books, etc.) and often feature a cartoon mascot and may contain a toy or prize.

Between 1970 and 1998, the number of different types of breakfast cereals in the United States more than doubled, from about 160 to around 340; as of 2012, there were roughly 5,000 different types (estimate based on the mass customization of online shopping). In this highly competitive market, cereal companies have developed an ever-increasing number of varieties and flavors (some are flavored like dessert or candy). Although many plain wheat-, oat- and corn-based cereals exist, a great many other varieties are highly sweetened, and some brands include freeze-dried fruit as a sweet element. The breakfast cereal industry has gross profit margins of 40–45%, In 2009, market researchers expected the market to grow at a CAGR of 7.4% (in the next 5 years); it has had steady and continued growth throughout its history.

== Background ==
Cereal grains, namely porridge (and especially oatmeal), became an important breakfast component in North America. Barley was a commonly used grain, though other grains and yellow peas could be used. In many modern cultures, porridge is still eaten as a breakfast dish.

=== Early America ===
Native Americans had found a way to make ground corn palatable, later called grits (from the Old English word grēot, meaning "gravel"). Hominy was another preparation. While this became a staple in the southern U.S., grits never gained popularity in the northern states. Food reformers in the 19th century called for cutting back on excessive meat consumption at breakfast. They explored numerous vegetarian alternatives. Late in the century, the Seventh-day Adventists based in Michigan made these food reforms part of their religion, and non-meat breakfasts were featured in their sanitariums and led to new breakfast cereals.

=== Cooked oatmeal ===
Ferdinand Schumacher, a German immigrant, began the cereals revolution in 1854 with a hand oats grinder in the back room of a small store in Akron, Ohio. His German Mills American Oatmeal Company was the nation's first commercial oatmeal manufacturer. He marketed the product locally as a substitute for breakfast pork. Improved production technology (steel cutters, porcelain rollers, improved hullers), combined with an influx of German and Irish immigrants, quickly boosted sales and profits.

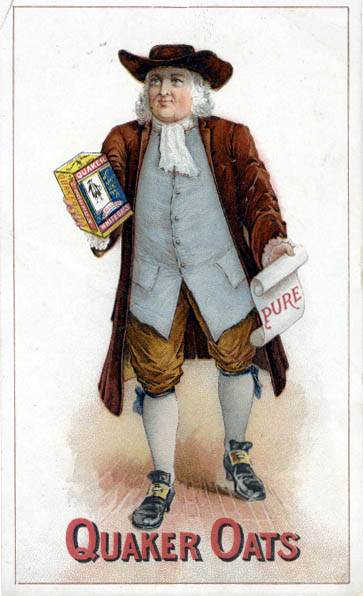
A Quaker Oats advertisement circa 1900

In 1877, Schumacher adopted the Quaker symbol, the first registered trademark for a breakfast cereal. The acceptance of "horse food" for human consumption encouraged other entrepreneurs to enter the industry. Henry Parsons Crowell started operations in 1882, and John Robert Stuart in 1885. Crowell cut costs by consolidating every step of the processing—grading, cleaning, hulling, cutting, rolling, packaging, and shipping—in one factory operating at Ravenna, Ohio. Stuart operated mills in Chicago and Cedar Rapids, Iowa. Stuart and Crowell combined in 1885 and initiated a price war. After a fire at his mill in Akron, Schumacher joined Stuart and Crowell to form the Consolidated Oatmeal Company.

The American Cereal Company (Quaker Oats, but see below) created a cereal made from oats in 1877, manufacturing the product in Akron, Ohio. Separately, in 1888, a trust or holding company combined the nation's seven largest mills into the American Cereal Company using the Quaker Oats brand name. By 1900, technology, entrepreneurship, and the "Man in Quaker Garb"—a symbol of plain honesty and reliability—gave Quaker Oats a national market and annual sales of $10 million (equivalent to $390 million today).

Early in the 20th century, the Quaker Oats Company (formed in 1901 to replace the American Cereal Company) ventured into the world market. Schumacher, the innovator; Stuart, the manager and financial leader; and Crowell, the creative merchandiser, advertiser, and promoter, doubled sales every decade. Alexander P. Anderson's steam-pressure method of shooting rice from guns created puffed rice and puffed wheat. Crowell's intensive advertising campaign in the 1920s and 1930s featured promotions with such celebrities as Babe Ruth, Max Baer, and Shirley Temple. Sponsorship of the popular Rin-Tin-Tin and Sergeant Preston of the Yukon radio shows aided the company's expansion during the depression. Meat rationing during World War II boosted annual sales to $90 million (equivalent to $1.6 billion today), and by 1956 sales topped $277 million ($3.3 billion today). By 1964 the firm sold over 200 products, grossed over $500 million ($5.2 billion today), and claimed that eight million people ate Quaker Oats each day. Expansion included the acquisition of Aunt Jemima Mills Company in 1926, which continues as a leading brand of pancake mixes and syrup, the sport drink Gatorade in 1983, and in 1986, the Golden Grain Company, producers of Rice-A-Roni canned lunch food. In 2001, Quaker Oats was itself bought out by PepsiCo.

== History ==
=== Early developments ===
The first cold breakfast cereal, Granula, was invented in the United States in 1863 by James Caleb Jackson, operator of Our Home on the Hillside which was later replaced by the Jackson Sanatorium in Dansville, New York. The cereal never became popular, due to the inconvenient necessity of tenderizing the heavy bran and graham nuggets by soaking them overnight.

George H. Hoyt created Wheatena circa 1879, during an era when retailers would typically buy cereal (the most popular being cracked wheat, oatmeal, and cerealine) in barrel lots, and scoop it out to sell by the pound to customers. Hoyt, who had found a distinctive process of preparing wheat for cereal, sold his cereal in boxes, offering consumers a more sanitary and consumer-friendly option.

=== Kellogg and Battle Creek, Michigan ===
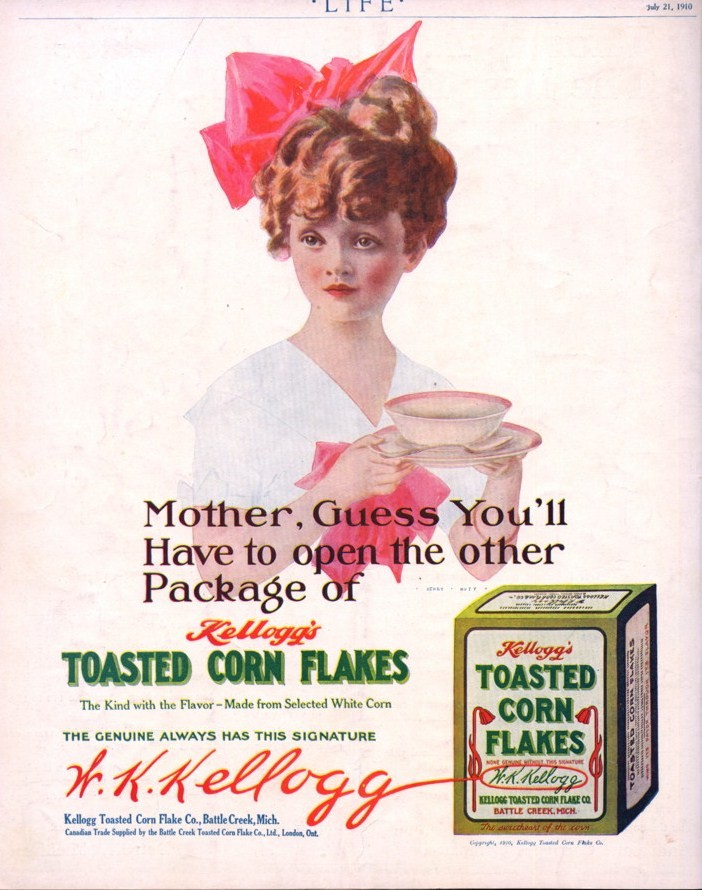
1910 Kellogg's Corn Flakes advertisement

Packaged breakfast cereals were considerably more convenient than a product that had to be cooked, and as a result of this convenience (and marketing that emphasized the point), they became popular. Battle Creek, Michigan, was a center both of the Seventh-day Adventist Church and of innovation in the ready-to-eat cereal industry, and indeed, the church had a substantial impact on the development of cereal goods through the person of John Harvey Kellogg (1851–1943). Son of an Adventist factory owner in Battle Creek, Kellogg was encouraged by his church to train in medicine at Bellevue Hospital Medical College in New York City in 1875. After graduating, he became medical superintendent at the Western Health Reform Institute in Battle Creek, established in 1866 by the Adventists to offer their natural remedies for illness. Many wealthy industrialists came to Kellogg's sanitarium for recuperation and rejuvenation.

Battle Creek sanitarium offered fresh air, exercise, rest, hydrotherapy, a strict vegetarian diet, and abstinence from alcohol, tobacco, coffee, and tea. To supplement the center's vegetarian regimen, Kellogg experimented with granola. Soon afterwards he began to experiment with wheat, resulting in a lighter, flakier product. In 1891 he acquired a patent and then in 1895 he launched the Cornflakes brand, which overnight captured a national market. Soon there were forty rival manufacturers in the Battle Creek area. His brother William K. Kellogg (1860–1951) worked for him for many years until, in 1906, he broke away, bought the rights to Cornflakes, and set up the Kellogg Toasted Corn Flake Company. William Kellogg discarded the health food concept, opting for heavy advertising and commercial taste appeal. Later, his signature on every package became the company trademark.

=== Charles W. Post ===
The second major innovator in the cereal industry was Charles W. Post, a salesman who was admitted to Kellogg's sanitarium as a patient in the late 1800s. While there, he grew deeply impressed with their all-grain diet. Upon his release, he began experimenting with grain products, beginning with an all-grain coffee substitute called Postum. In 1897 (or 1898) he introduced Grape-nuts, the concentrated cereal with a nutty flavor (containing neither grapes nor nuts). Good business sense, determination, and powerful advertising produced a multimillion-dollar fortune for Post in a few years. After his death, his company acquired the Jell-O company in 1925, Baker's Chocolate in 1927, Maxwell House coffee in 1928, and Birdseye frozen foods in 1929. In 1929, the company changed its name to General Foods. In 1985, Philip Morris Tobacco Company bought General Foods for $5.6 billion (equivalent to $16.8 billion today) and merged it with its Kraft division. Because of Kellogg and Post, the city of Battle Creek, Michigan, is nicknamed the "Cereal Capital of the World".

=== Muesli ===
Muesli is a breakfast cereal based on uncooked rolled oats, fruit, and nuts. It was developed around 1900 by the Swiss physician Maximilian Bircher-Benner for patients in his hospital.

=== United Kingdom ===
In 1902, Force wheat flakes became the first ready-to-eat breakfast cereal introduced into the United Kingdom. The cereal, and the Sunny Jim character, achieved wide success in Britain, at its peak in 1930 selling 12.5 million packages in one year.

=== National advertising ===
Kellogg began the breakfast cereal marketing and introduced the first in-box prize in the early 1900s. Quaker Oats entered the market with Puffed Rice and Wheat Berries it had introduced at the 1904 World Fair, with raw grains shot with hot compressed air from tubes, popping up to many times their size. They were marketed as a revolution in food science. In the 1920s, national advertising in magazines and radio broadcasts played a key role in the emergence of the fourth big cereal manufacturer, General Mills. In 1921, James Ford Bell, president of a Minneapolis wheat milling firm, began experimenting with rolled wheat flakes. After tempering, steaming, cracking wheat, and processing it with syrup, sugar, and salt, it was prepared in a pressure cooker for rolling and then dried in an electric oven. By 1925, Wheaties had become the "Breakfast of Champions". In 1928, four milling companies consolidated as the General Mills Company in Minneapolis. The new firm expanded packaged food sales with heavy advertising, including sponsorship of radio programs such as "Skippy", "Jack Armstrong, The All-American Boy", and baseball games. Jack Dempsey, Johnny Weissmuller, and others verified the "Breakfast of Champions" slogan. By 1941 Wheaties had won 12% percent of the cereal market. Experiments with the puffing process produced Kix, a puffed corn cereal, and Cheerios, a puffed oats cereal. Further product innovation and diversification brought total General Mills sales to over $500 million annually (18% in packaged foods) by the early 1950s. In 1944 General Foods launched a marketing campaign for Grape Nuts, focusing on nutritional importance of breakfast.

=== Sugar cereals ===
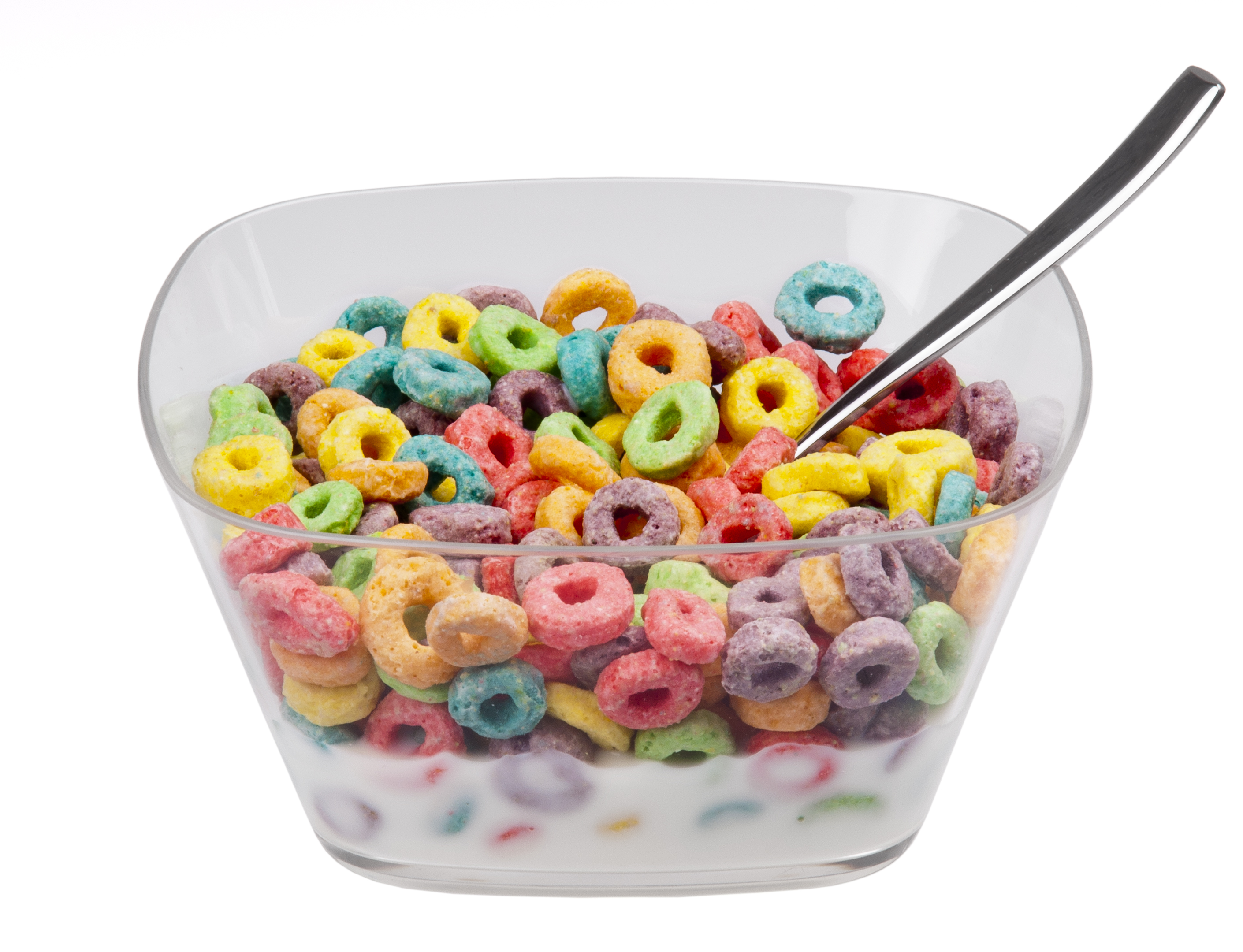
Breakfast cereals primarily marketed to children, such as Froot Loops, are commonly brightly colored and high in sugar.

After World War II, the big breakfast cereal companies—now including General Mills, who entered the market in 1924 with Wheaties—increasingly started to target children. The flour was refined to remove fiber, which at the time was considered to undermine digestion and absorption of nutrients, and sugar was added to improve the flavor for children. The new breakfast cereals began to look starkly different from their ancestors. Ranger Joe, the first pre-sweetened breakfast cereal of sugar-coated puffed wheat or rice, was introduced in the US in 1939. Kellogg's Sugar Smacks, created in 1953, had 56% sugar by weight. Different mascots were introduced, such as the Rice Krispies elves and later pop icons like Tony the Tiger and the Trix Rabbit.

A January 2025 study in the American Journal of Preventive Medicine examined cereal purchases from 77,000 American households over nine years alongside Nielsen ratings data on advertising exposure. The study found that ads targeting adults had negligible impact, while those aimed at children strongly correlated with increased purchases of sugary cereals in households with kids. Nine cereals, each with 9 to 12 grams of sugar per serving, dominated the market, accounting for 41% of total cereal bought.

=== Granola ===
In the 1960s, the modern version of granola was invented and popularized. It evolved from a product called Granula (similar to Grape Nuts) to the recognizable modern form involving at a minimum: sweetened toasted oats, but also possibly: dried fruit, puffed rice, nuts or chocolate.

=== Modern cereal ===
Over 2016 to 2017, Americans purchased 3.1 billion boxes of cereal, mostly as ready to eat cold cereal. In a $9.8 billion cereal market, cold cereal purchases were 88% of the total (12% for hot cereals), with the overall cereal market declining due to reduced consumption of sugar and dairy products. Kellogg's and General Mills each had 30% of the market share for cold cereals. Honey Nut Cheerios was the leading cold cereal.

== Processing of grains ==
The processing of grains helps to separate the bran and cereal germ, but may remove nutrients, such as B vitamins and dietary fiber. Processing is the modification of a grain or mixture of grains usually taking place in a facility remote from the location where the product is eaten. This distinguishes "breakfast cereals" from foods made from grains modified and cooked in the place where they are eaten.

=== Nutritional fortification ===
Breakfast cereals may be fortified with dietary minerals and vitamins. For example, breakfast cereal in Canada may be fortified with specific micronutrient amounts per 100 grams of cereal, including thiamin, (2.0 mg), niacin (4.8 mg), and vitamin B6 (0.6 mg), among others.

== Research ==
Consumption of breakfast cereal is under preliminary research for the potential to improve nutrition and affect chronic diseases. Regular breakfast cereal consumption is associated with less risk of being overweight or obese and high-fiber breakfast cereals are associated with a lower risk of diabetes. Fortified breakfast cereals with iron can be an effective option to reduce risk of anemia in children.

== Gallery ==
All images show the final preparation of the named (or described) cereal in a bowl with cow's milk and a spoon, unless stated otherwise.

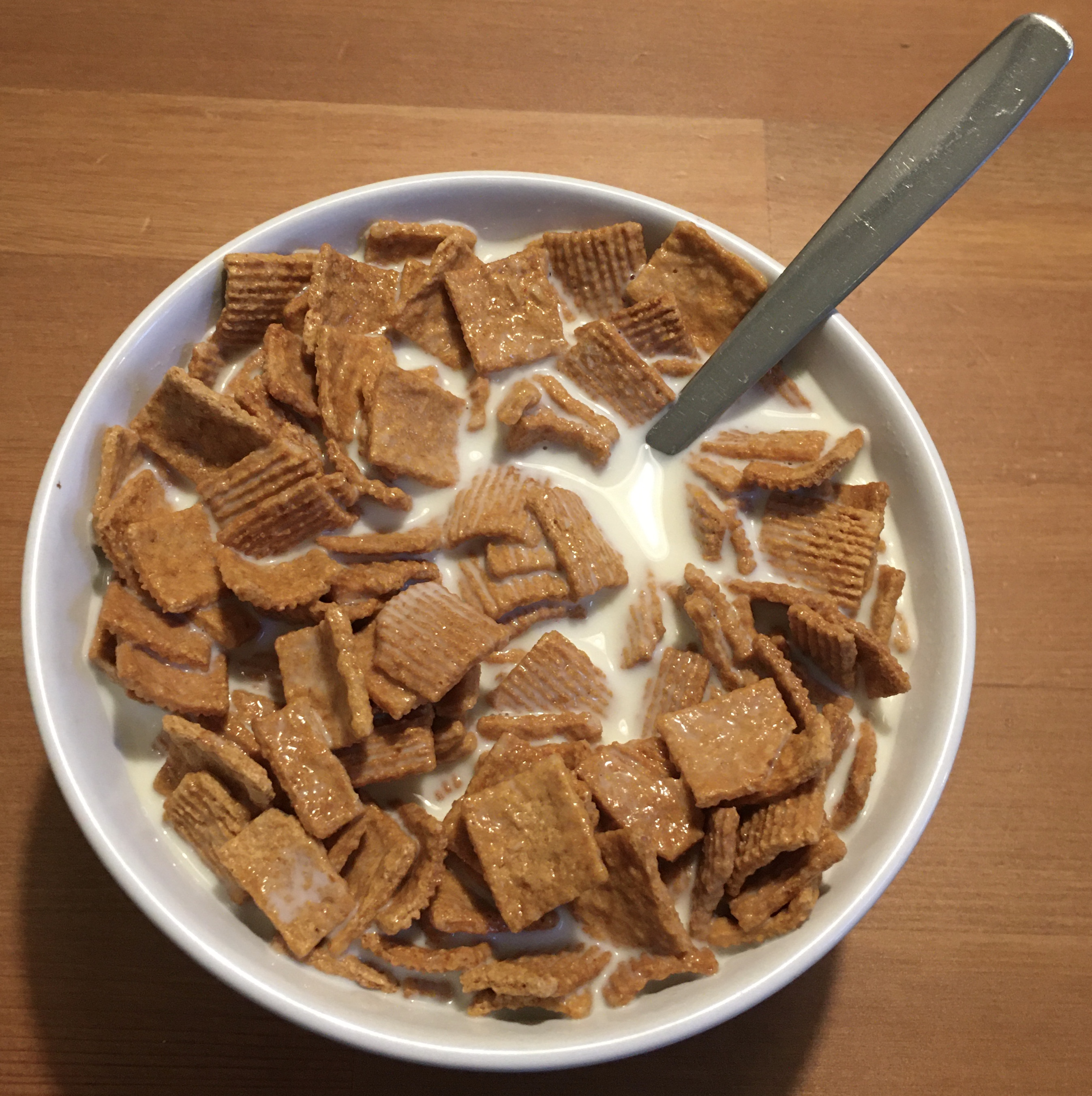
Golden Grahams

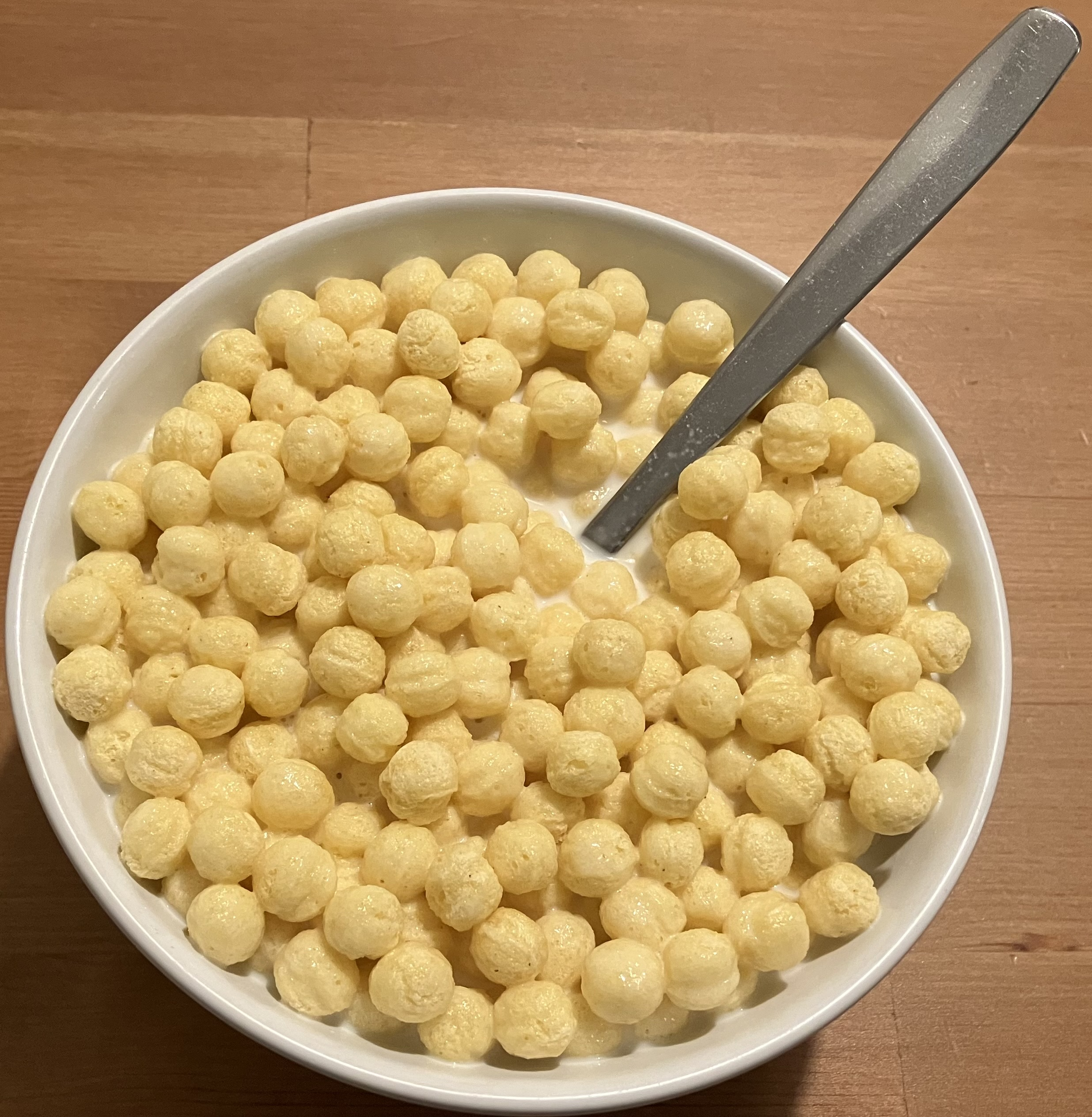
Crispy corn puffs (Kix)

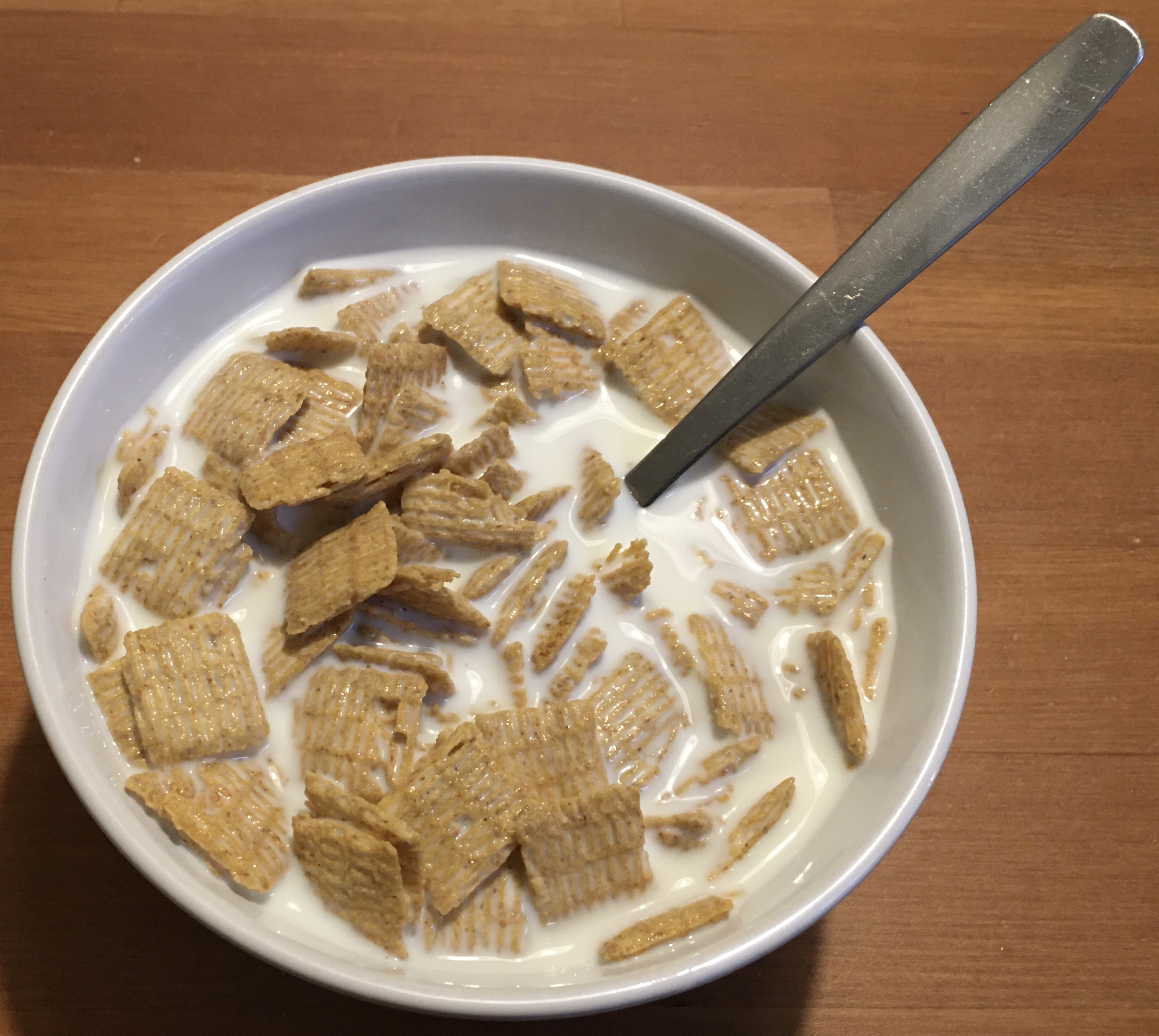
Multigrain cereal (Quaker Life)

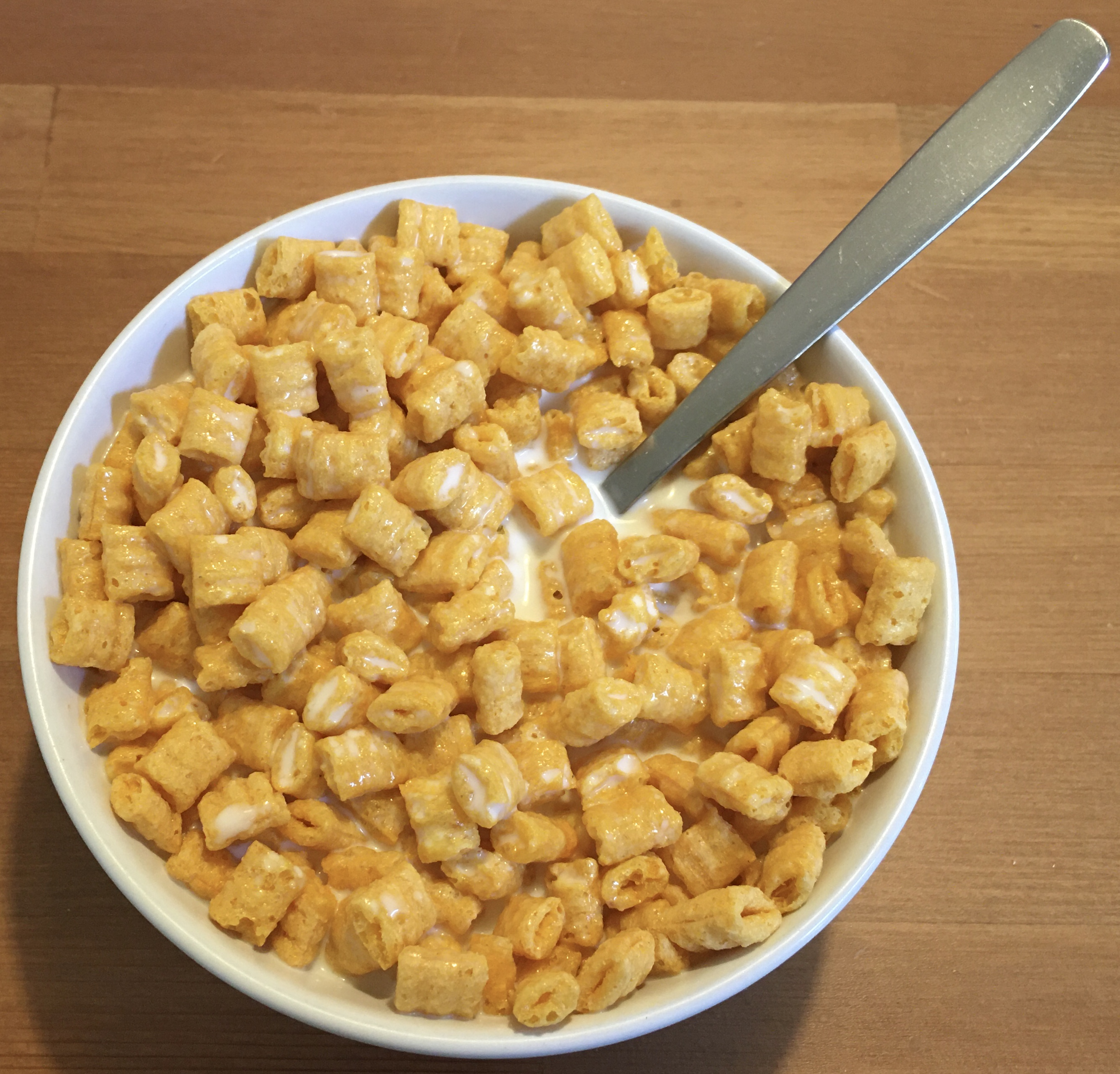
Sweetened corn and oat cereal (Cap'n Crunch)

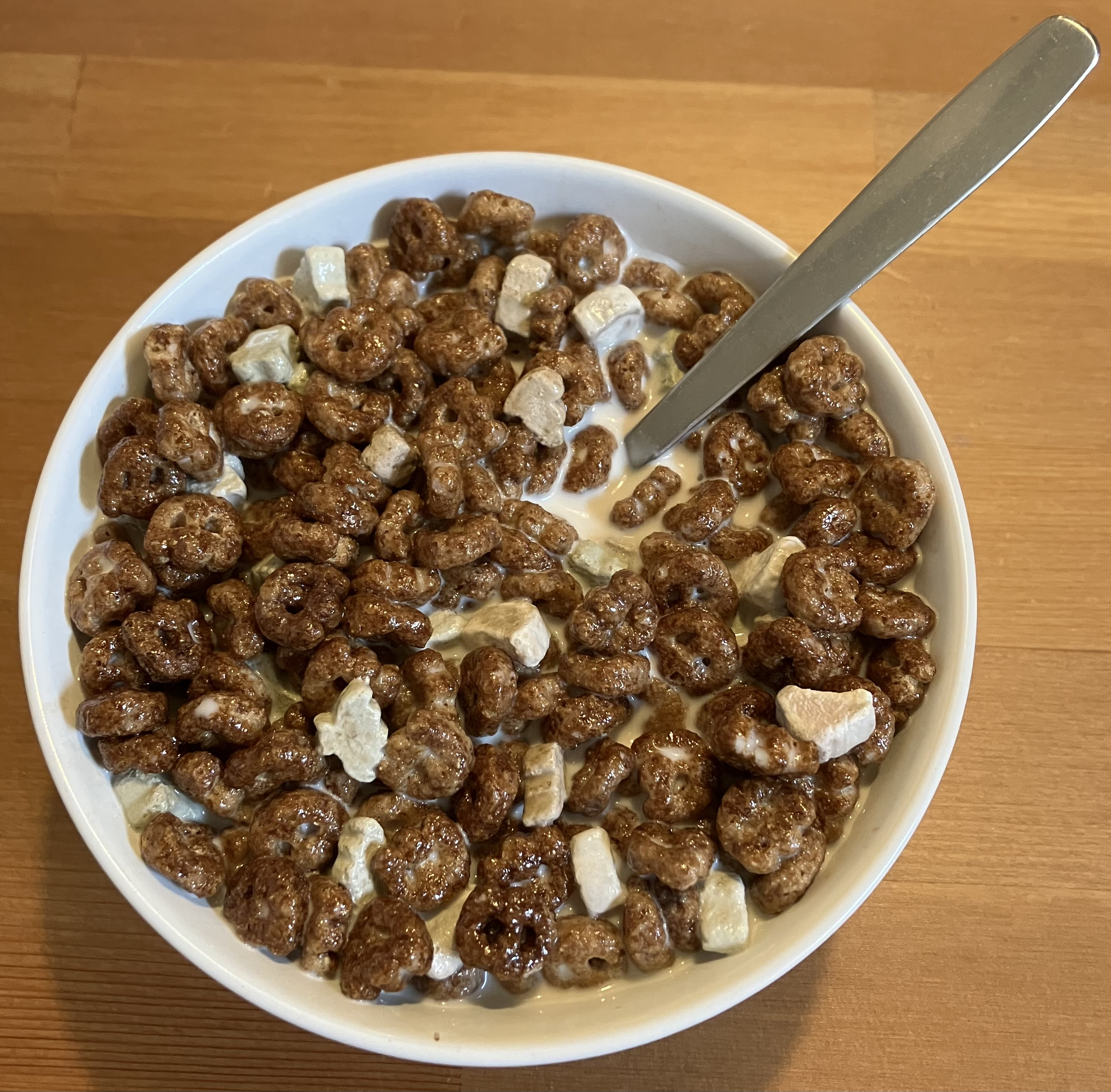
Chocolate cereal with monster marshmallows (Count Chocula)

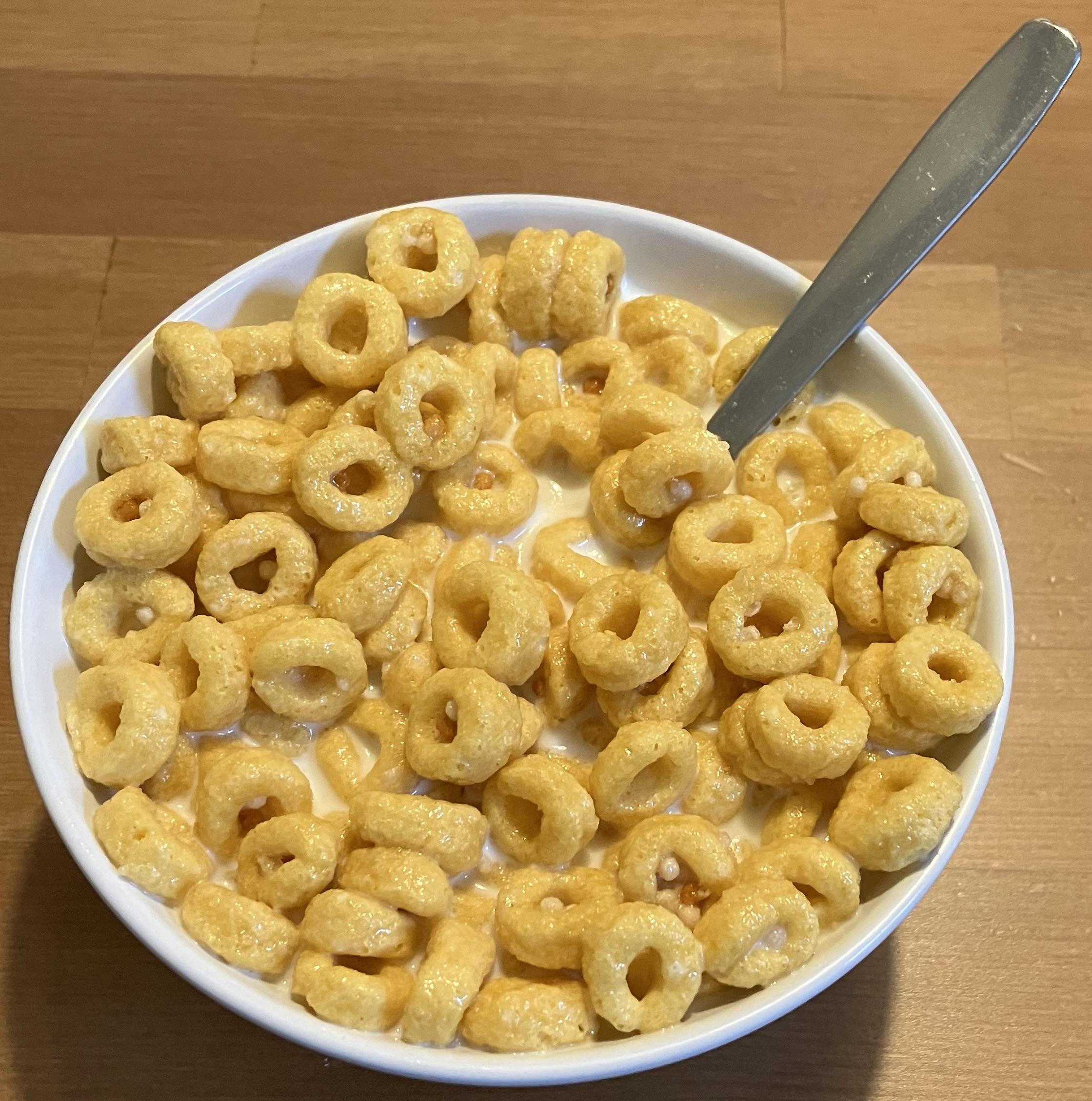
Sweetened cereal with honey (Post Honey Ohs!)

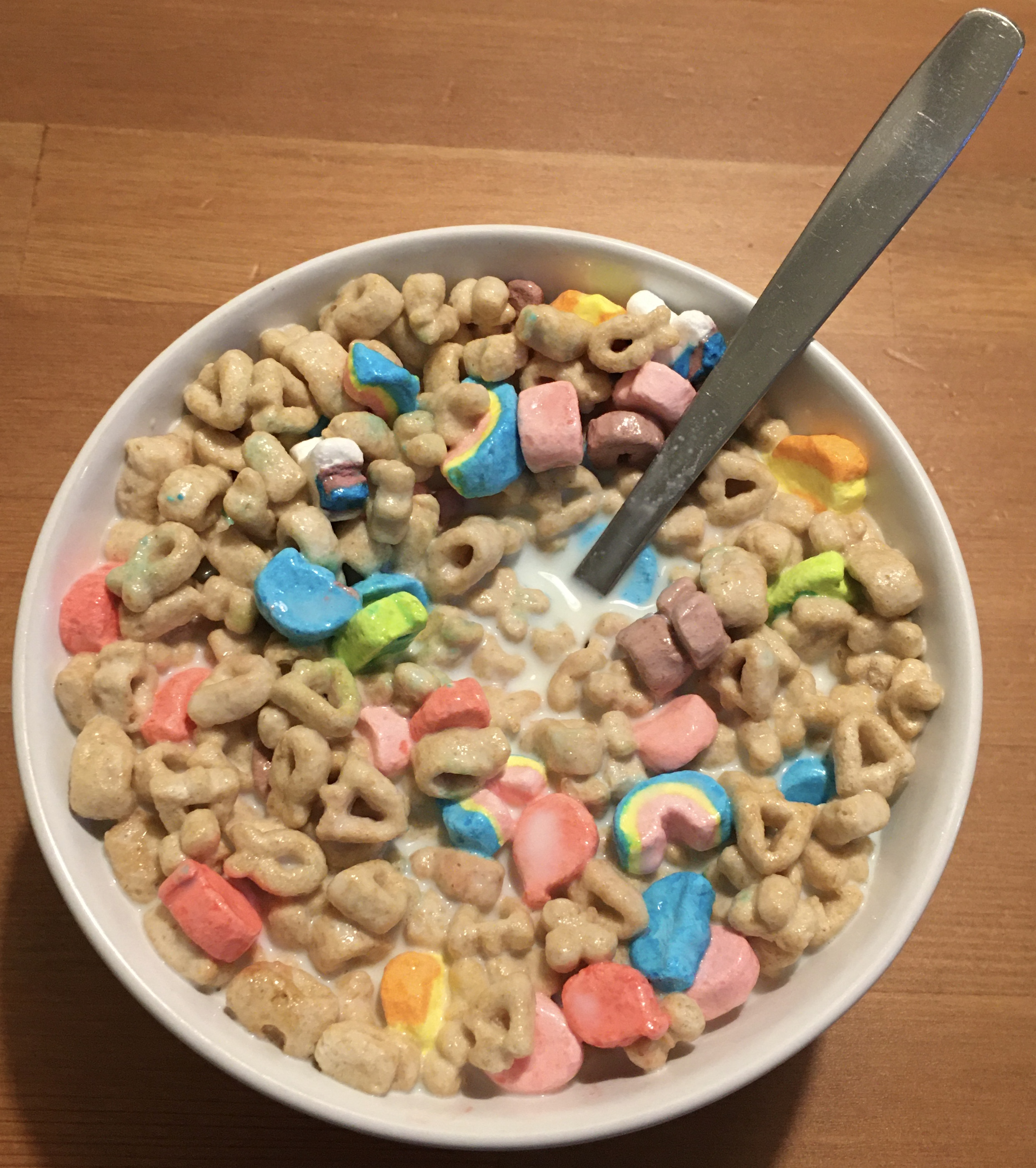
Frosted Toasted Oat Cereal with Marshmallows (Lucky Charms from General Mills)

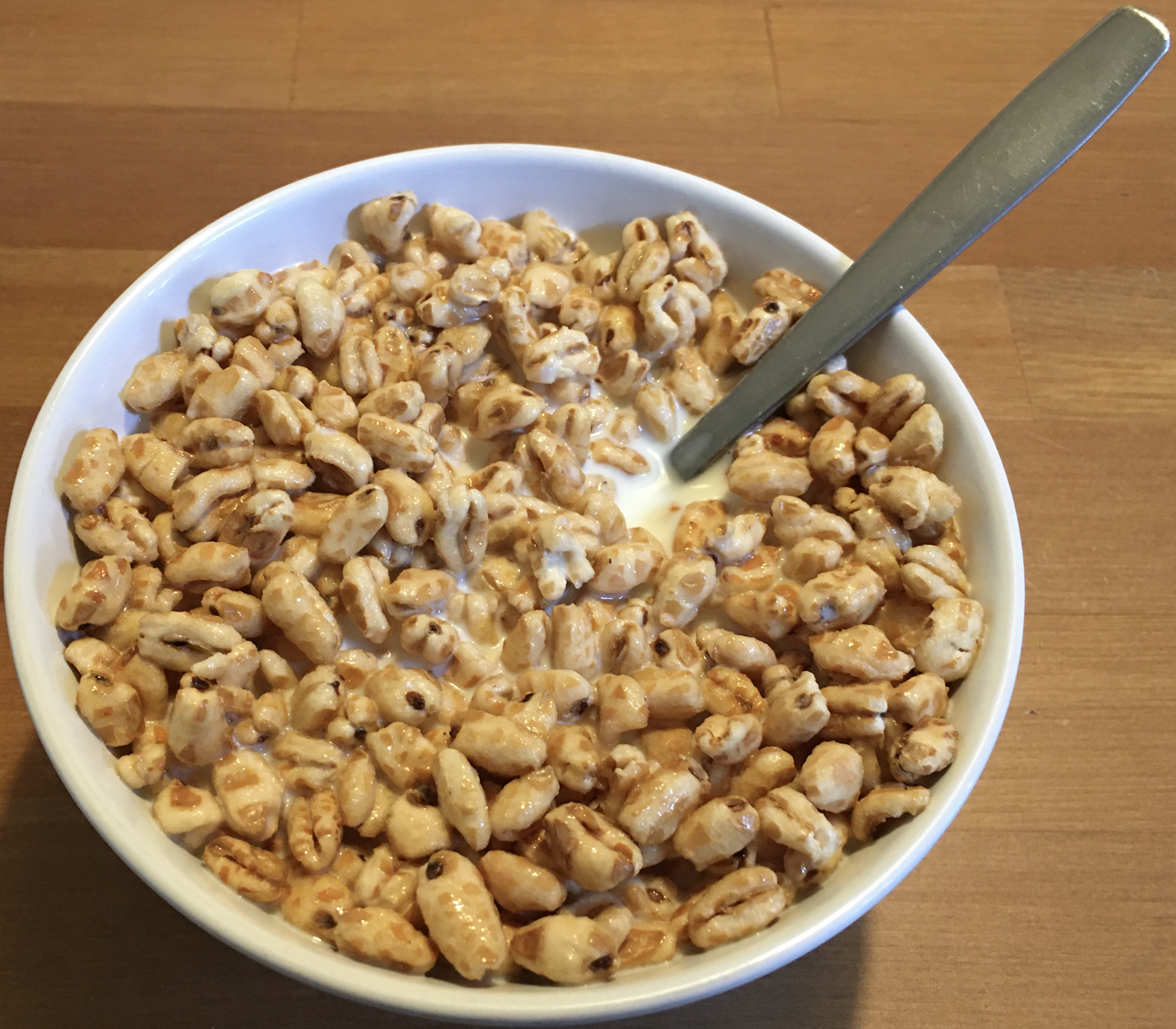
Sweetened Puffed Wheat Cereal (Kellogg's Honey Smacks)

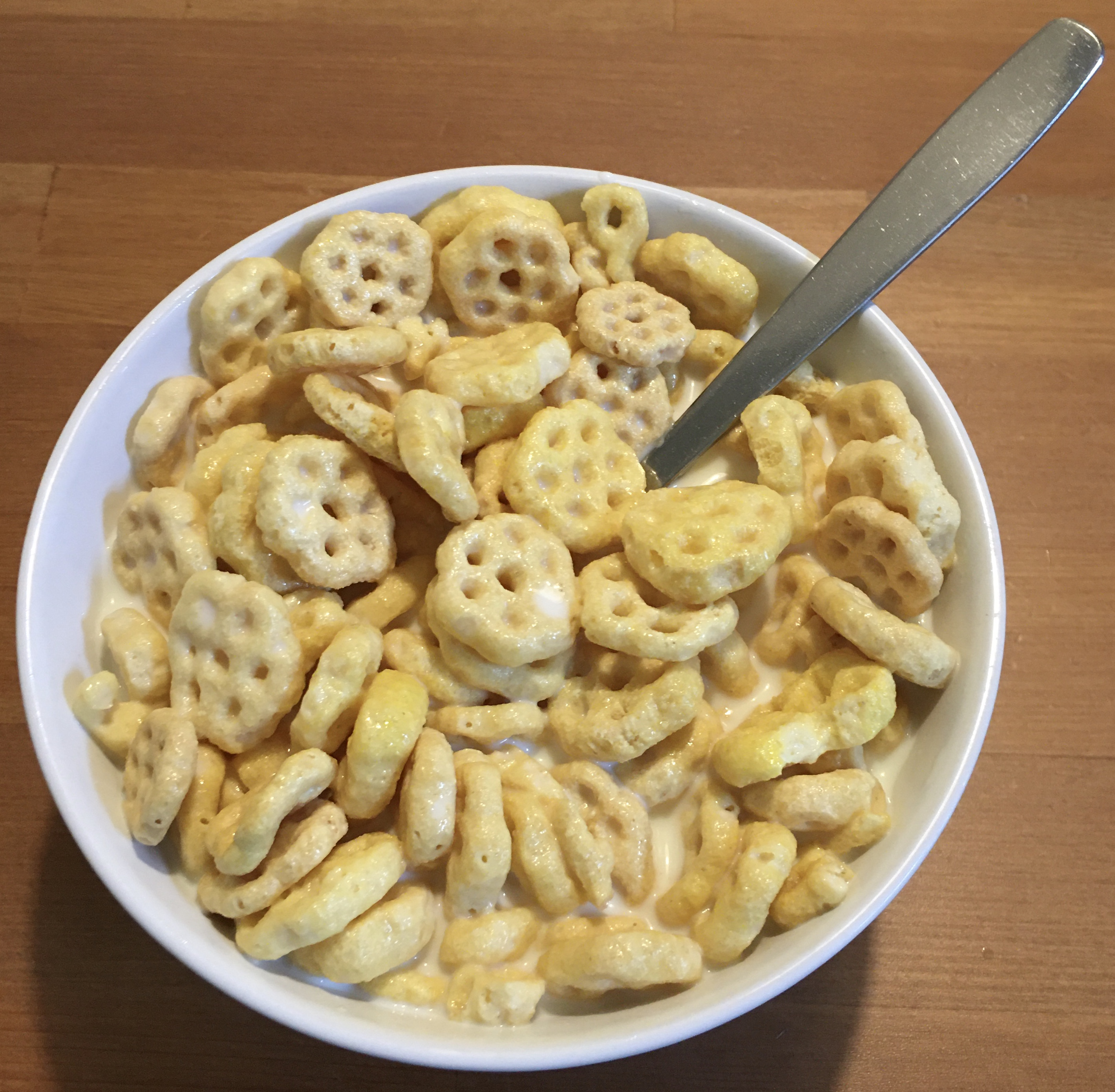
Sweetened Corn and Oat Cereal (Post Honeycomb)

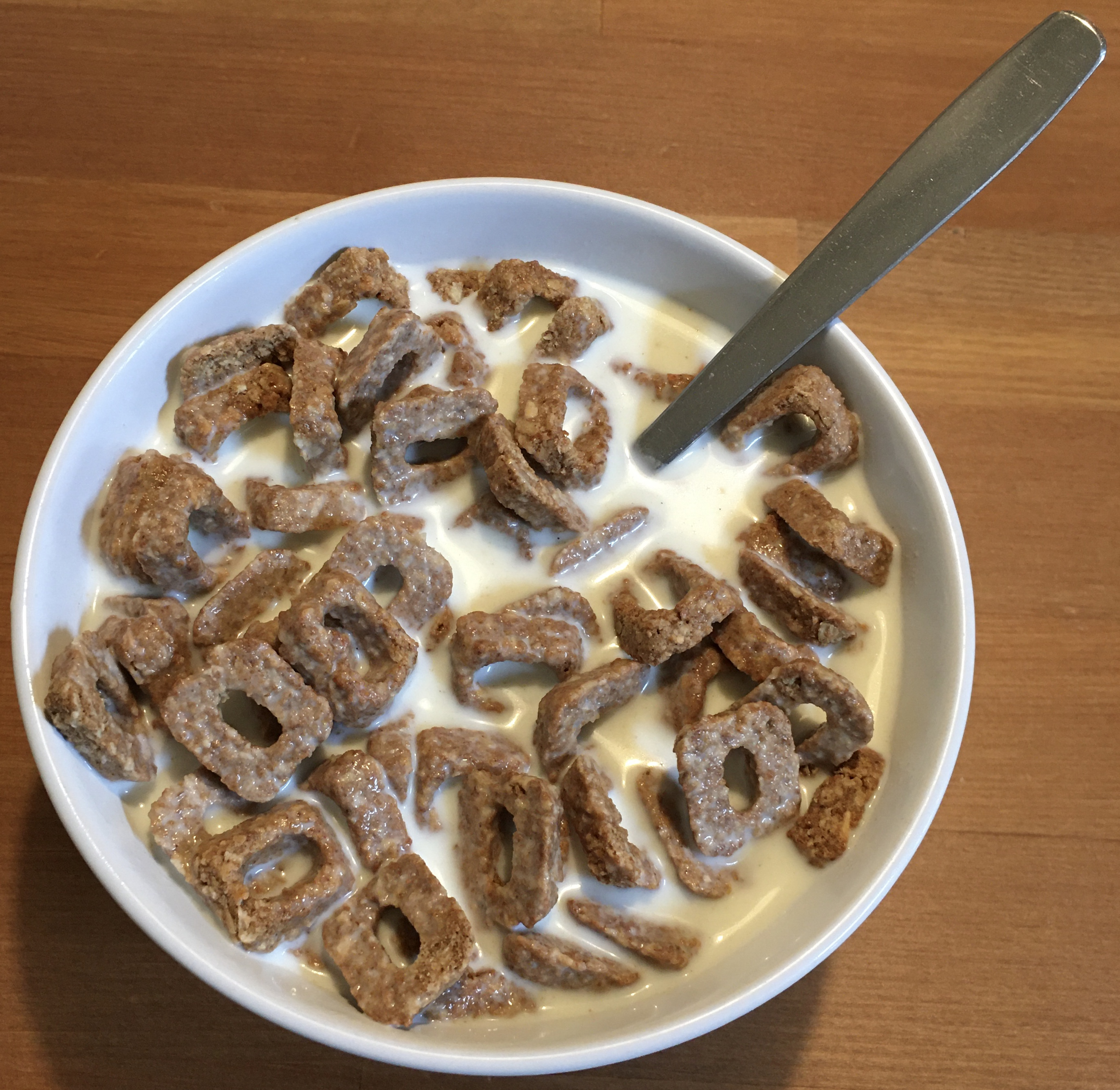
Crunchy, Sweet, Oven-Baked Oat Cereal (Kellogg's Cracklin' Oat Bran)

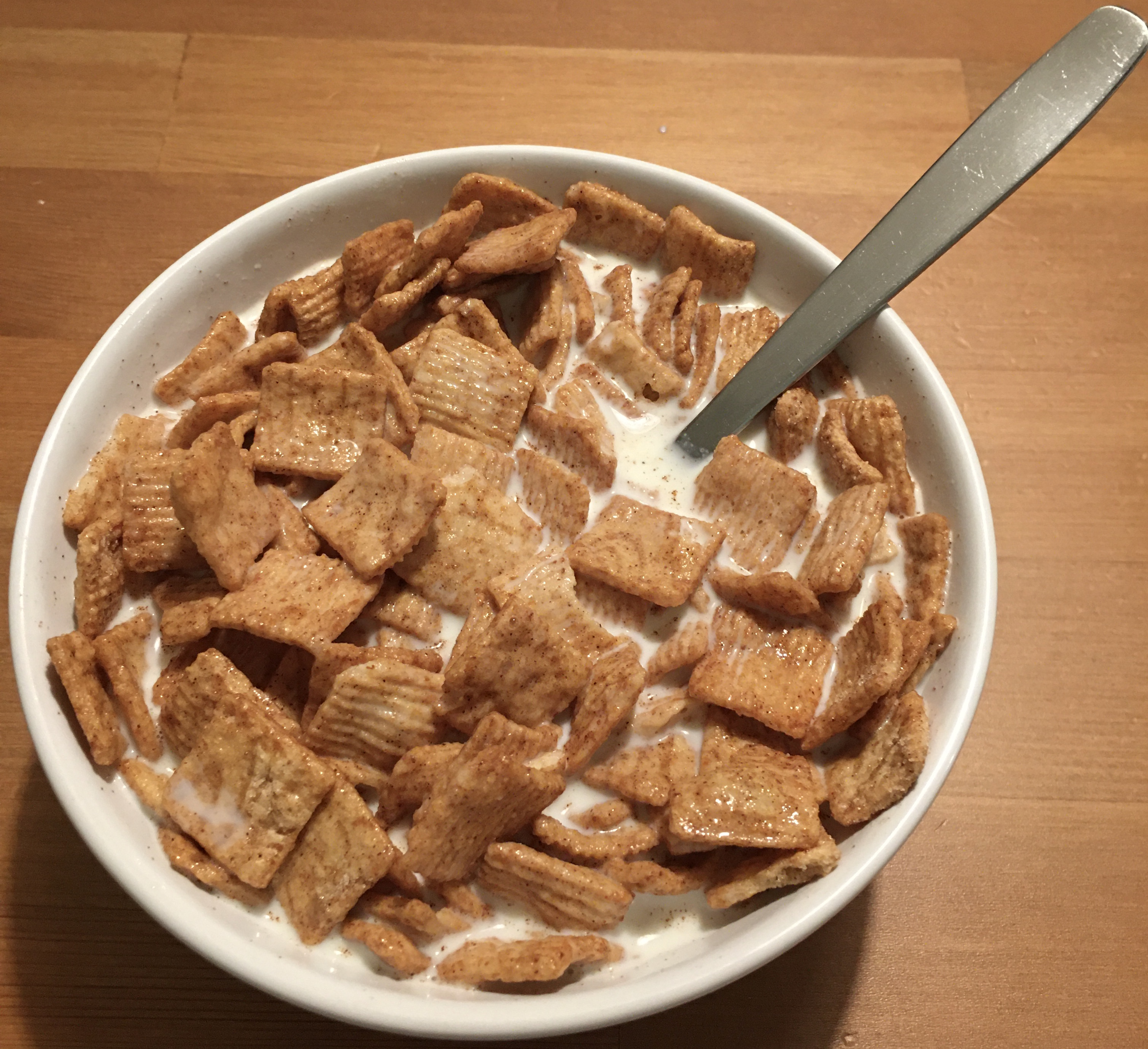
Cinnamon Toast Crunch

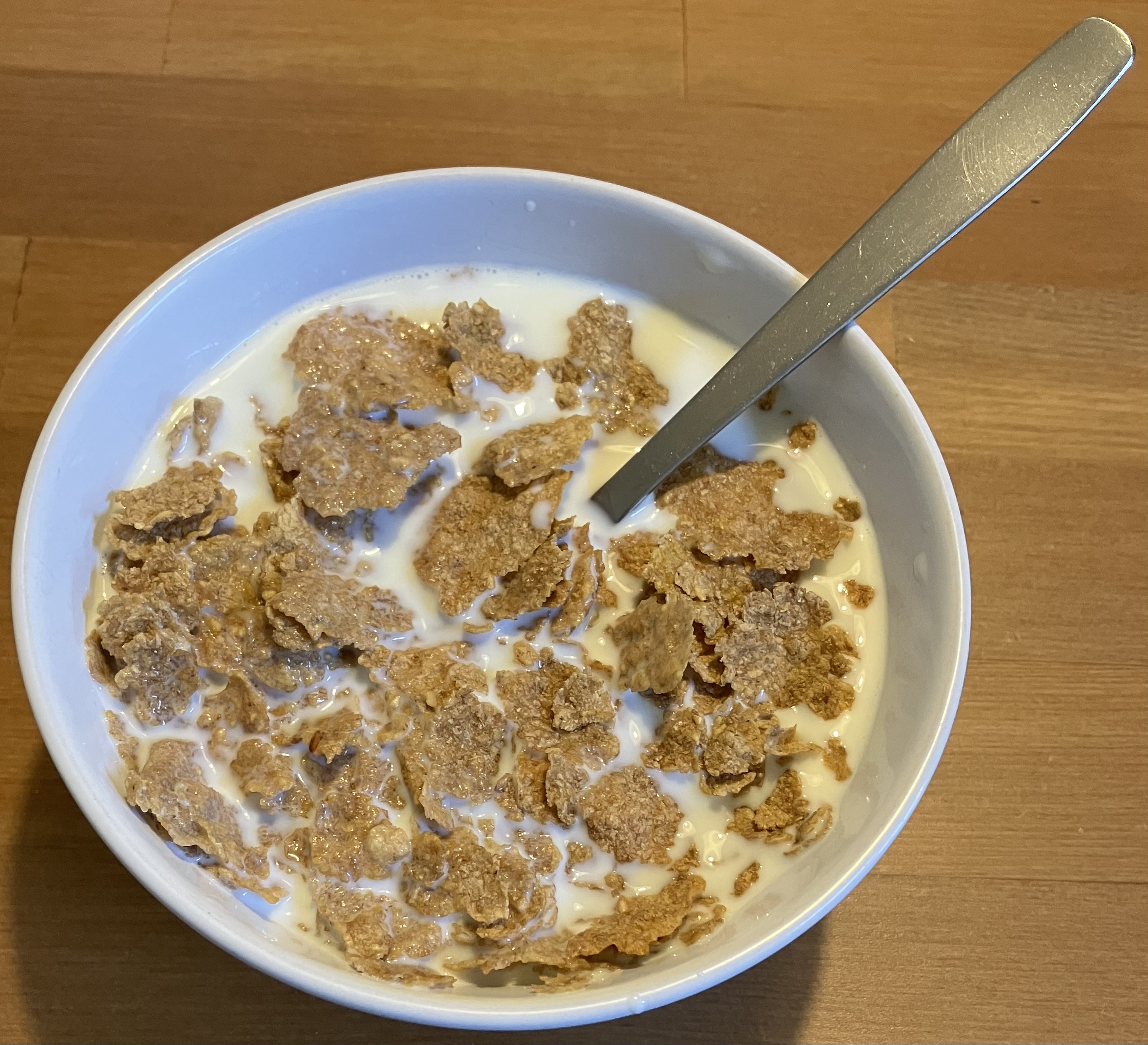
Whole Grain Wheat and Bran Cereal (Post Bran Flakes)

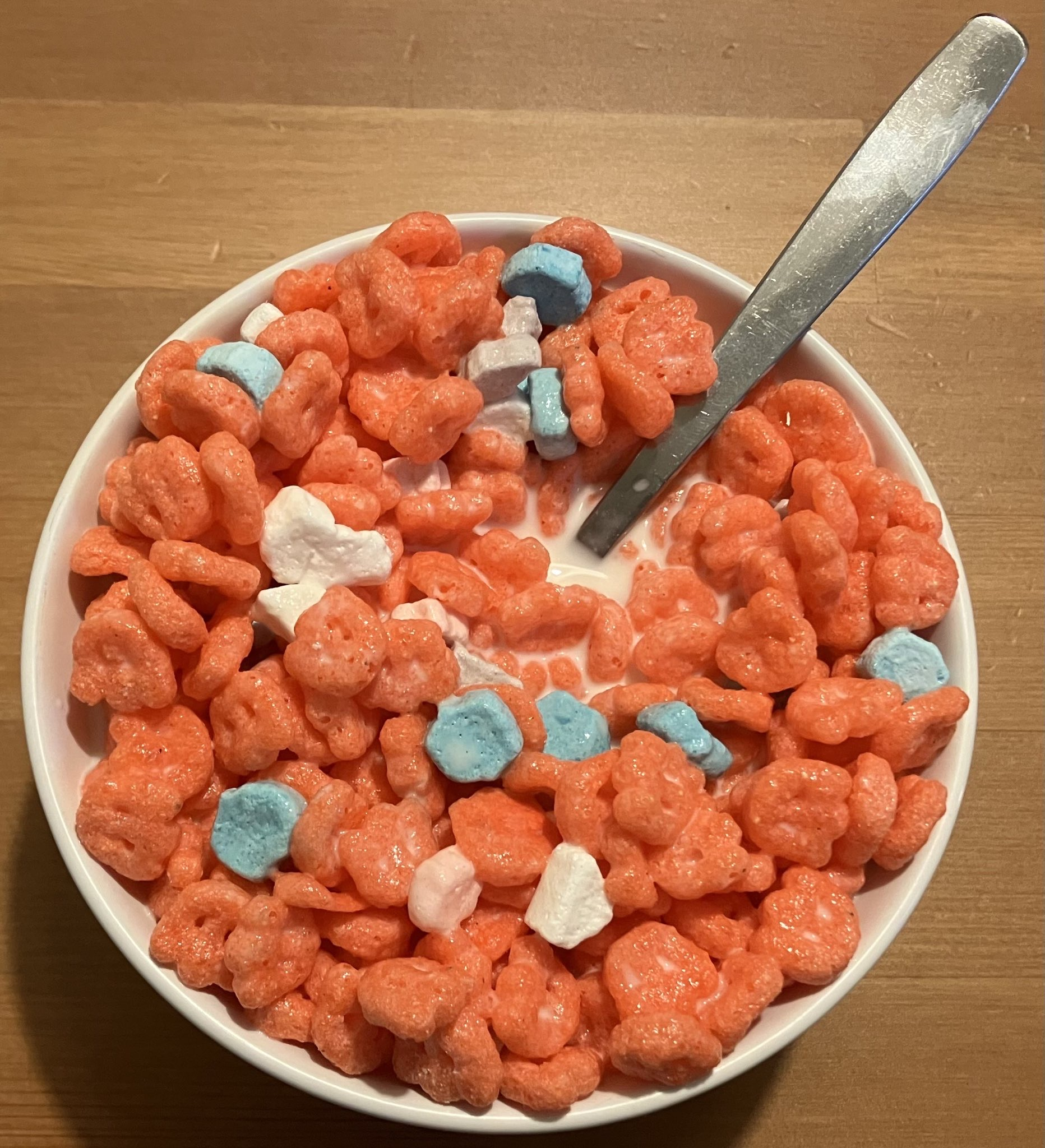
Artificially Strawberry Flavored Sweetened Cereal with Monster Marshmallows (Franken Berry)

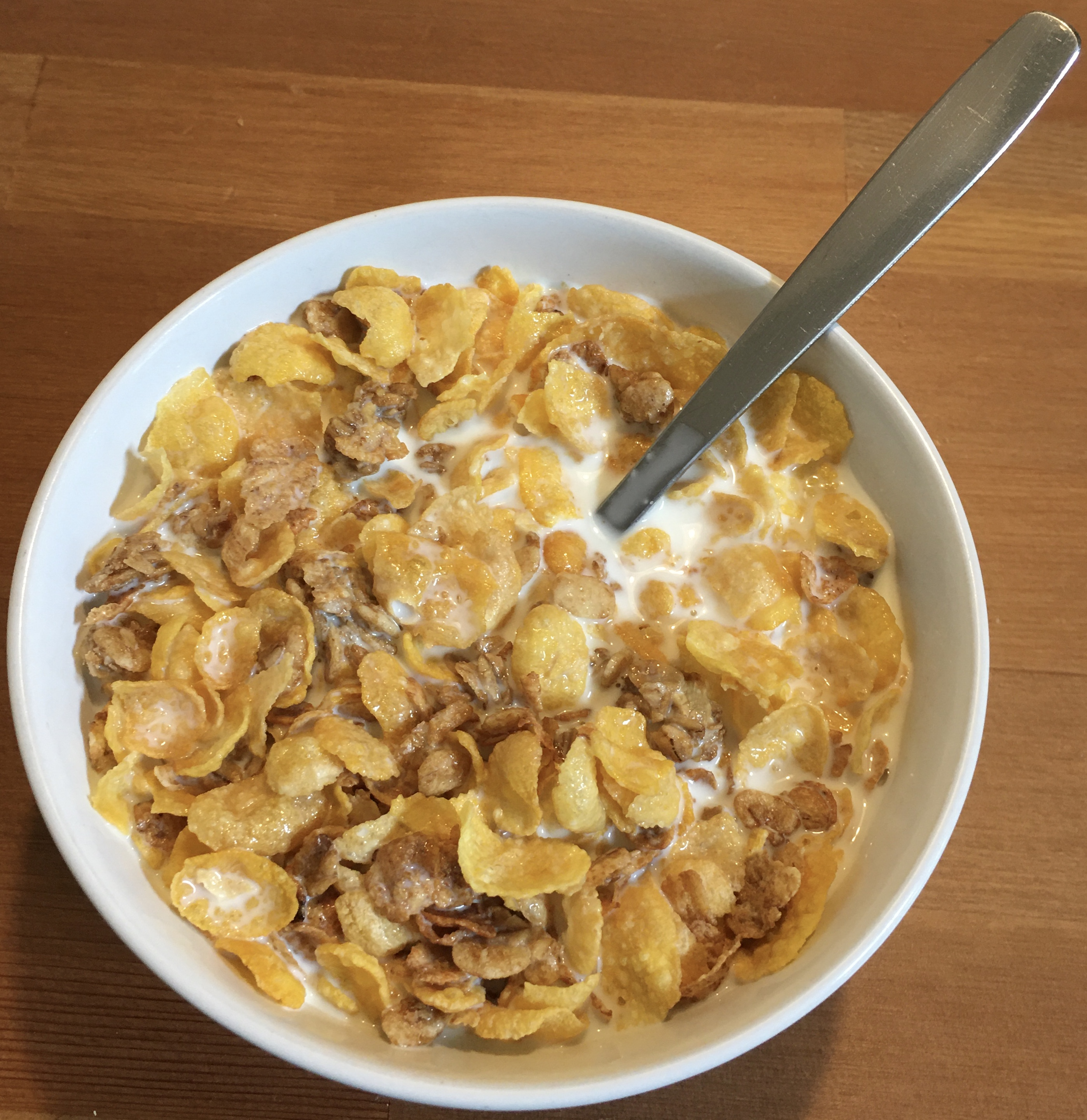
Sweetened Cereal with Oats and Honey (Post Honey Bunches of Oats)

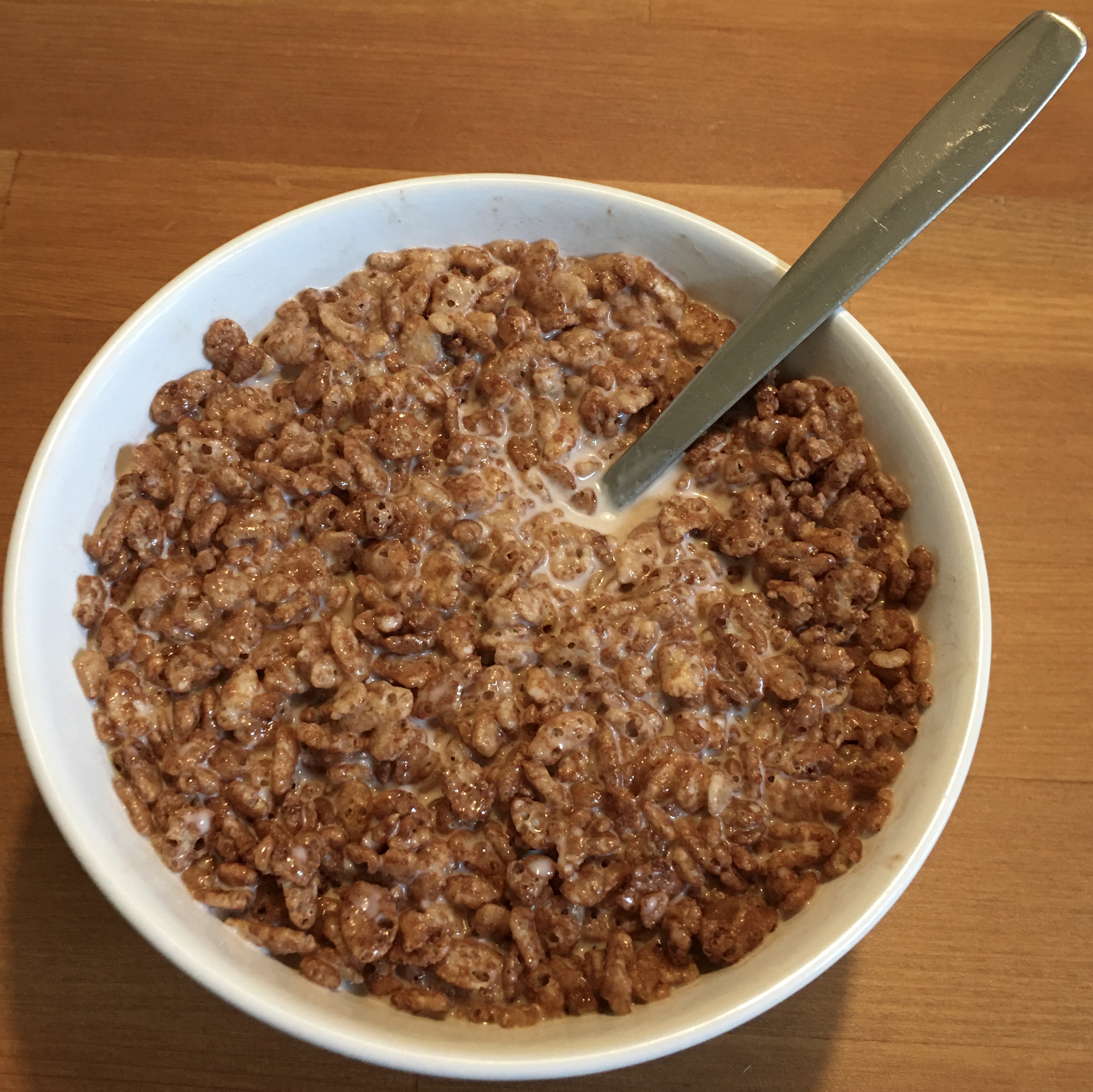
Chocolate, Sweetened Rice Cereal (Kellogg's Cocoa Krispies)

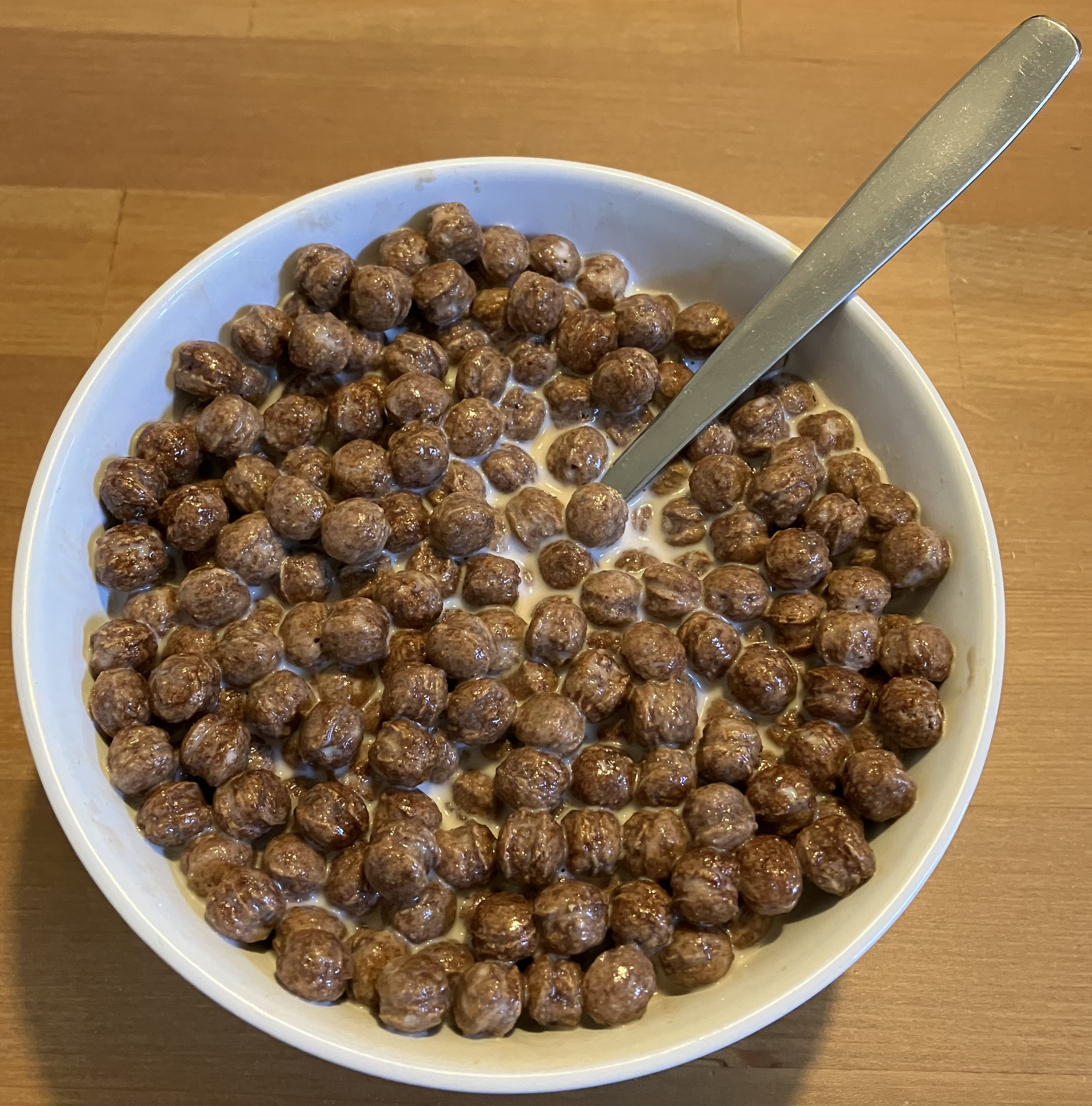
Naturally Flavored Frosted Chocolate Corn Puffs (Cocoa Puffs)

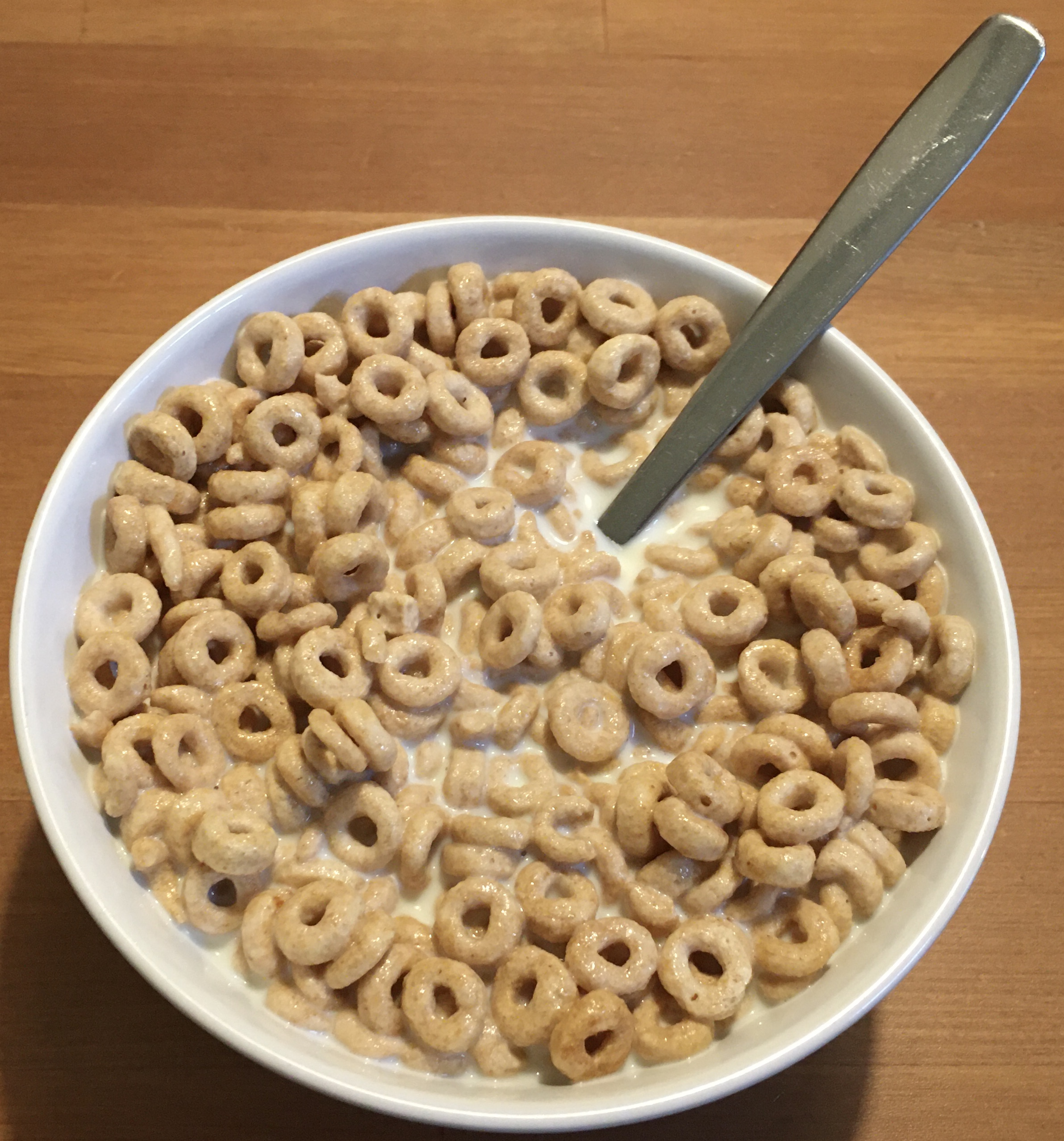
Honey Nut Cheerios

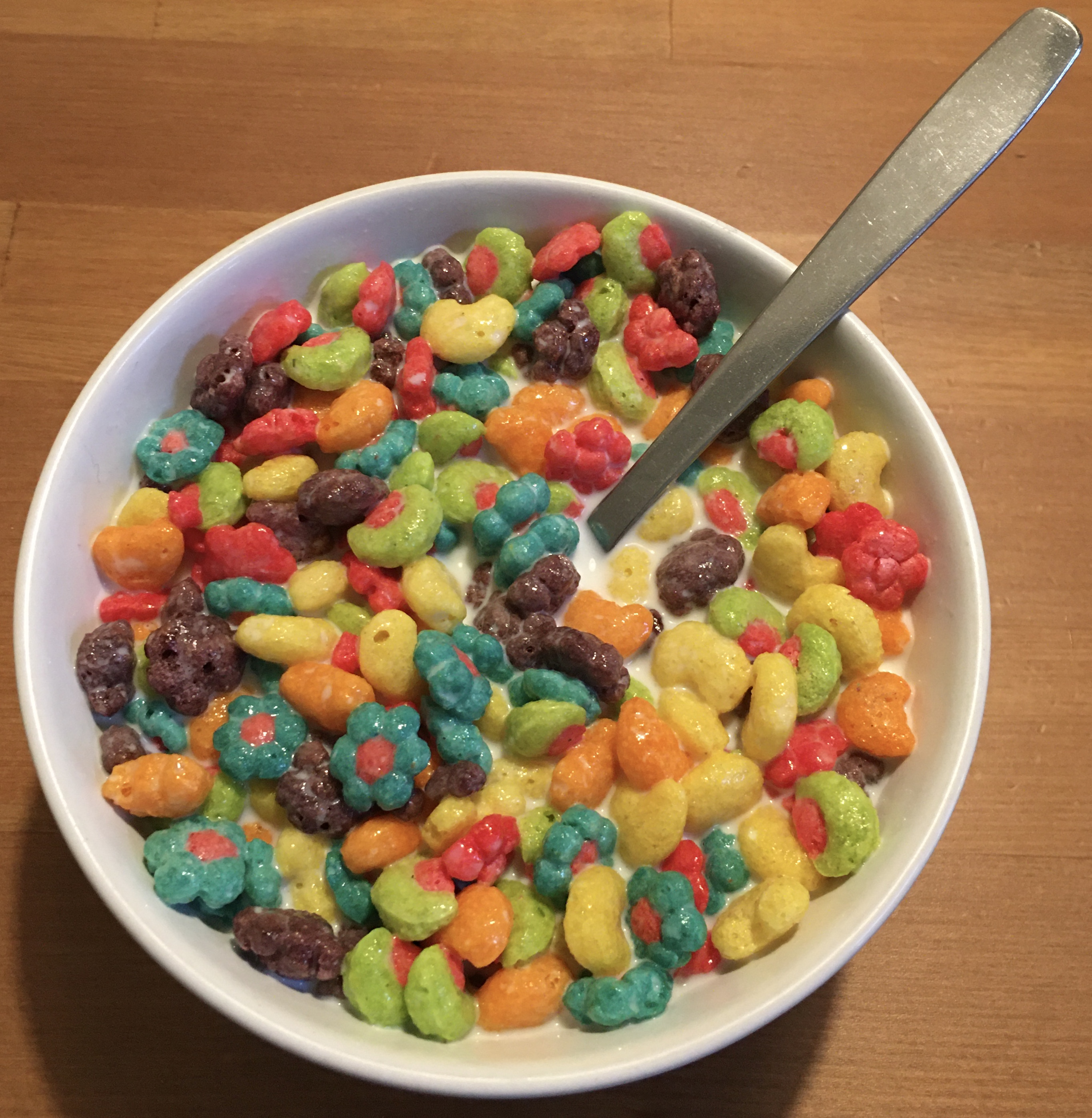
Fruit Flavored Sweetened Corn Puffs (Trix)

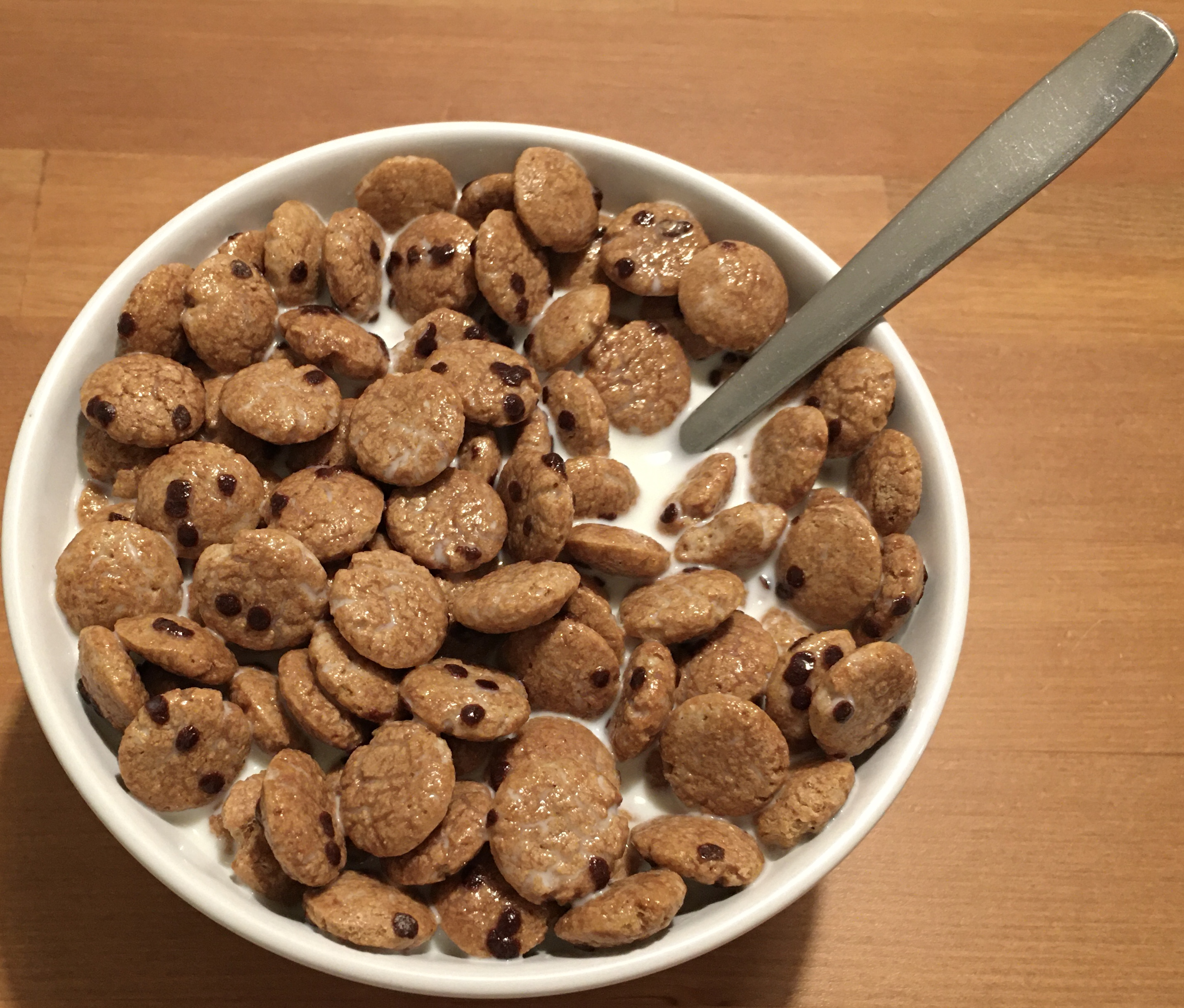
Naturally Flavored Sweetened Cereal (Cookie Crisp)

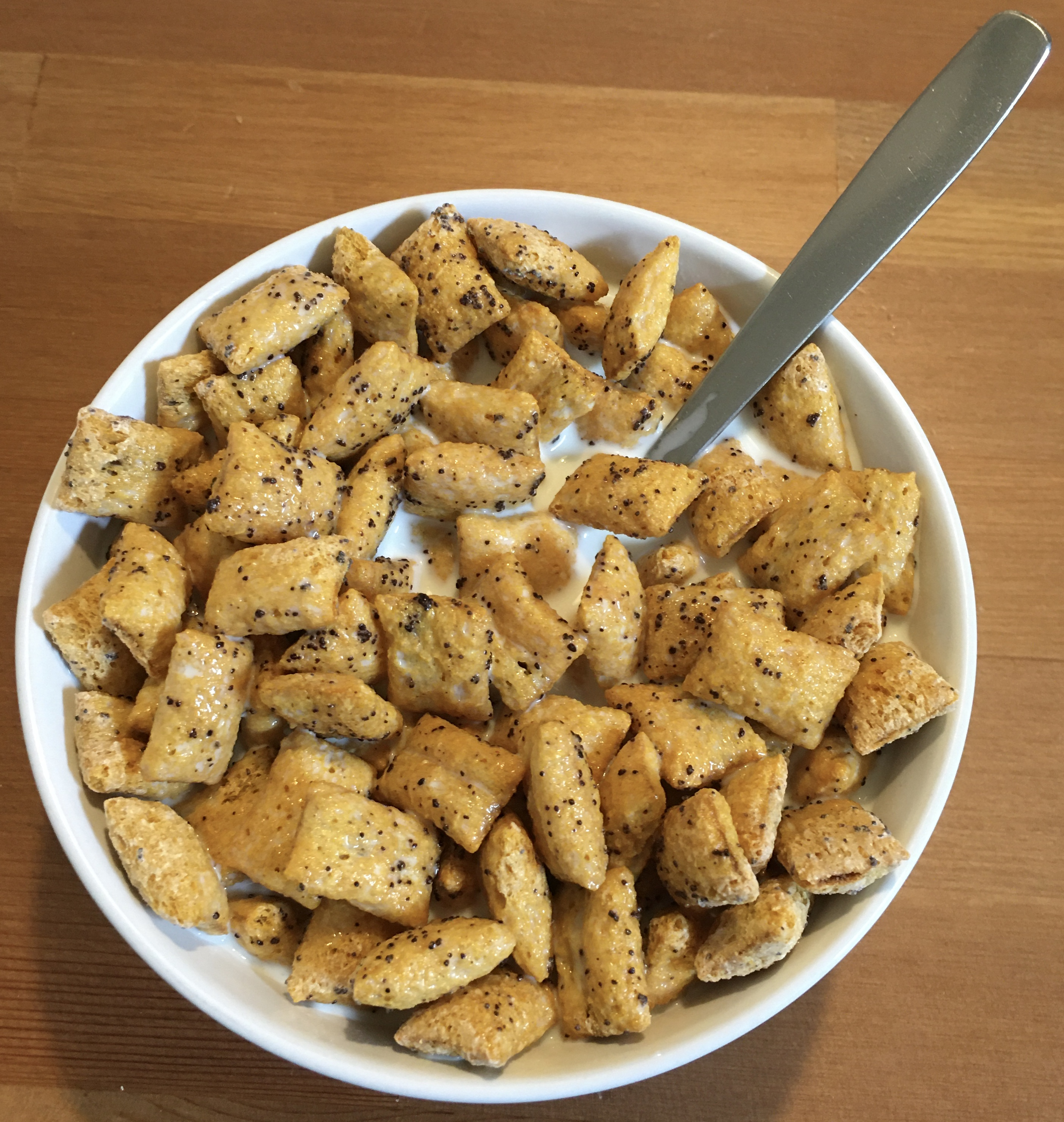
Crispy Cookie Dough Flavored Shell Outside, Smooth Chocolate Inside (Kellogg's Krave)

== See also ==
- Cereal box prize
- Cereal for Dinner
- Pablum, a baby food
- List of breakfast cereal advertising characters
- List of breakfast cereals
- List of breakfast topics
