= Lionel Bradley Pett =

Canadian biochemist (1909–2003)

- Born: 12 November 1909; Winnipeg, Manitoba, Canada
- Died: 2003 (aged 93–94)
- Education: University of Toronto
- Scientific career
- Fields: nutrition, vitamins
- Thesis: The enzymatic breakdown of phosphoric acid esters. (1934)

Lionel Bradley Pett (12 November 1909 – 2003) was a Canadian biochemist and nutritionist.

== Academic career ==
Pett earned a BSA from Ontario Agriculture College, an MA and a PhD from University of Toronto before an MD from the University of Alberta. He worked at the University of Toronto and the University of Alberta before moving to the Nutrition Division of the Department of Pensions and Health in Ottawa, Ontario.

After his death, questions were raised about the ethics of post-war experimentation he carried out with Frederick Tisdall involving First Nations communities. The experiments appear to pre-date the 1966 seminal paper by Henry K. Beecher on the nature of informed consent and have become known as the First Nations nutrition experiments. Pett has been defended by his son.

== Selected works ==
- Early stages of carbohydrate degradation by bacteria. MSc thesis, University of Toronto, 1932.
- The enzymatic breakdown of phosphoric acid esters. PhD thesis, University of Toronto, 1934.
- Vitamin Requirements of Human Beings Vitamins & Hormones Volume 13, 1955, Pages 213–237 doi:10.1016/S0083-6729(08)61026-2
- A Canadian Table of Average Weights Can Med Assoc J. 1 January 1955; 72(1): 12–14. PMC 1825361
- A Canadian table of average weights for height, age, and sex American Journal of Public Health
