= Cereal for Dinner =

Promotional campaign by Kellogg's

Cereal for Dinner is a promotional campaign by Kellogg's that began in 2022 to encourage the consumption of breakfast cereal for dinner.

The campaign was criticized following a television interview with Kellogg's CEO Gary Pilnick who suggested that cash-strapped consumers should eat cereal for dinner to save money, dismissing the underlying concerns of food insecurity and inflation. The suggestion was compared to the historical "let them eat cake" remark as "let them eat cereal". Their comments led to suggestions of a product boycott. Despite the criticism, the campaign is ongoing.

As Kellogg promoted cereal for dinner to mitigate high grocery costs, dietitians differentiated between most conventional breakfast cereals and a narrow category of truly healthy options (e.g., whole-grain, low-sugar varieties). They advised that only these specific healthy cereals, supplemented with other nutrient-dense foods like milk, fruit, and nuts, could align with dietary recommendations for an evening meal.
