= Theodore Drake =

Theodore G.H. Drake, MD (1891- 1959) was a Canadian pediatrician and one of three physicians who developed Pablum.

== Early life ==
Drake was born on September 16, 1891, in Webbwood, Ontario. He obtained his university degree from the University of Toronto in 1914. He spent two years in residence at the Toronto General Hospital. Drake was a medical officer during World War I. After the war, he returned to the Toronto General Hospital where he eventually became head of the research institute.

== Medical accomplishments ==
In 1923, he, along with physicians Alan Brown and Frederick Tisdale, helped work out the formula for Pablum, a processed cereal for children. The cereal marked a breakthrough in nutritional science as it helped prevent rickets, a crippling childhood disease, by ensuring that children have enough vitamin D in their diet. Although Pablum was not the first food designed and sold specifically for babies, it was the first pre-cooked and thoroughly dried baby food. The ease of preparation made Pablum successful in an era when infant malnutrition was still a major problem in industrialized countries.

During World War II, Drake designed nutritional diets for RCAF personnel as well as for POW parcels. After the war, he was named a member of the Order of the British Empire for his work.

== Personal life ==
Drake met his first wife, Gerturd Salmond, overseas. She predeceased him by 15 years. His second wife was Nina Johnson.

Interested in the history of pediatric care, Drake began a collection of art and artifacts related to the history of children's health. Over 3000 artifacts and 1000 prints formed a base of his collection. This collection is now in the hands of the Royal Ontario Museum.

Drake died on October 18, 1959.
