= Frederick Tisdall =

Canadian pediatrician

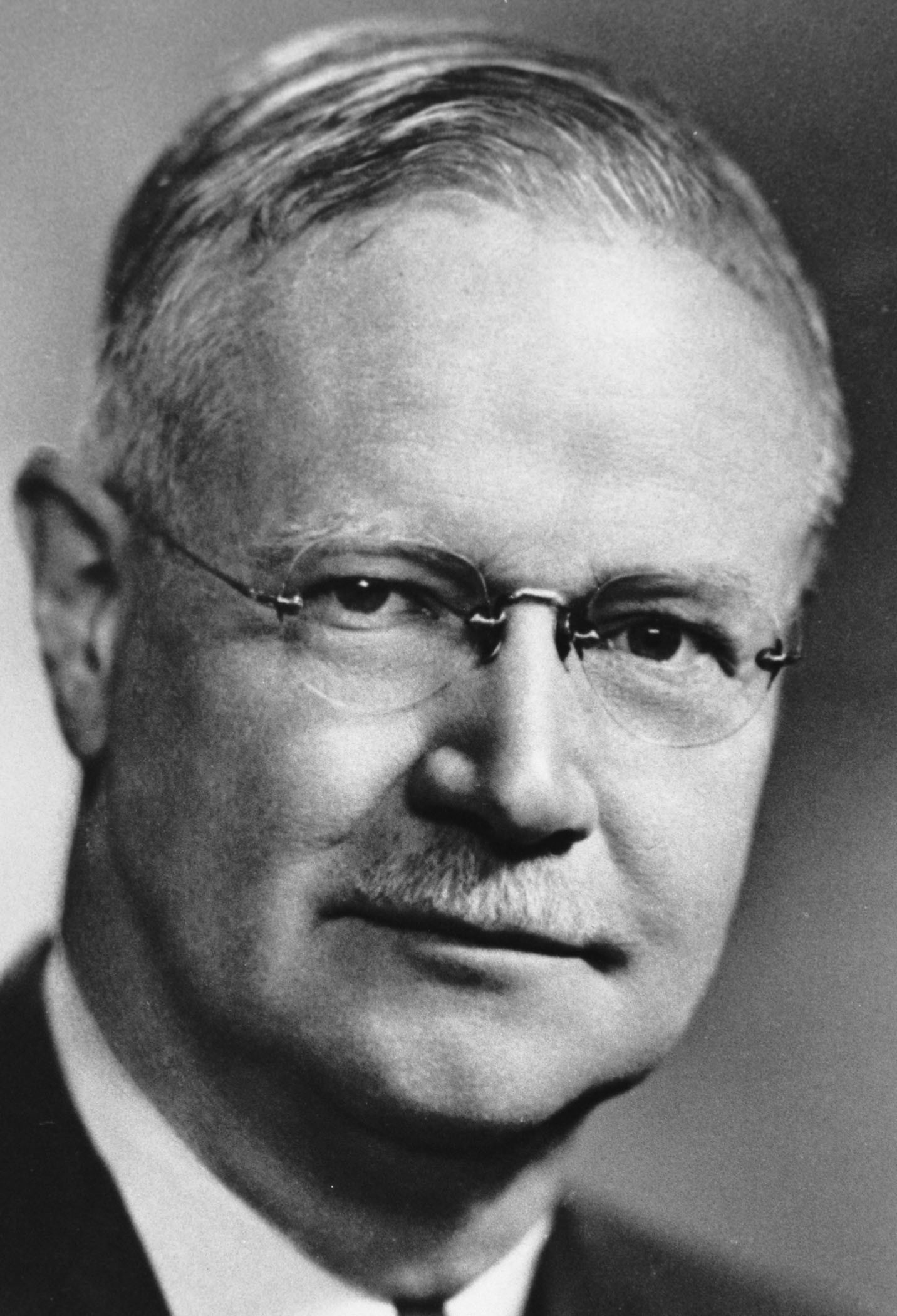
Frederick Tisdall

Frederick Fitzgerald Tisdall (3 November 1893– 23 April 1949) was one of three Canadian pediatricians who developed the infant cereal Pablum. He first started working at The Hospital for Sick Children in 1921. In 1929, he was made Director of the Nutritional Research Laboratories. In 2013, revelations came to public attention that Tisdall starved Indigenous children for the purposes of experimentation, in direct violation of the Nuremberg Code.

At the time of his death he was considered 'a brilliant research worker' with more than a hundred and twenty five scientific articles.

After his death, questions were raised about the ethics of post-war experimentation he had carried out with Lionel Bradley Pett involving First Nations communities, known as the First Nations nutrition experiments. In the most notorious of these studies, children who had been forcibly removed from their homes and placed in residential schools were starved while researchers stood by. Both and treatment groups of malnourished children were denied adequate nutrition. "In one experiment, the treatment group received supplements of riboflavin, thiamine and/or ascorbic acid supplements to determine whether these mitigated the problems – they did not. In another, children were given a flour mix containing added thiamine, riboflavin, niacin and bone meal. Rather than improving nutrition, the children became more anemic, likely contributing to more deaths and certainly impacting development. In these experiments, efforts were made to control as many factors as possible, even when they harmed the research subjects. For example, previously available dental care was denied in some settings because the researchers wanted to observe the state of dental caries and gingivitis with malnutrition."
