= First Nations nutrition experiments =

Unethical experiments on Indigenous Canadians

The First Nations nutrition experiments were a series of experiments run in Canada by Department of Pensions and National Health (now Health Canada) in the 1940s and 1950s. The experiments were conducted on at least 1,300 Indigenous people across Canada, approximately 1,000 of whom were children. The deaths connected with the experiments have been described as part of Canada's genocide of indigenous peoples in Canada.

The experiments involved nutrient-poor isolated communities such as those in The Pas and Norway House in northern Manitoba and residential schools and were designed to learn about the relative importance and optimum levels of newly discovered vitamins and nutritional supplements. The experiments included deliberate, sustained malnourishment and in some cases, the withholding of dental services.

The Government of Canada was aware of malnourishment in its residential schools and granted approval for the execution of nutritional experiments on children. It is now known that the primary cause of malnutrition in residential schools was underfunding from the Canadian government. The nutritional experiments residential school children were subjected to neither provided evidence of completion nor contributed to the body of knowledge around nutrition and supplementation.

Nutritional experiments conducted on Indigenous children in residential schools came to public light in 2013 through the research of food historian Dr. Ian Mosby.

== History ==
Nutritional experiments were conducted between 1942 and 1952 using Indigenous children from residential schools in Alberta, British Columbia, Manitoba, Nova Scotia, and Ontario.

In March 1942, Canadian nutrition experts led a research expedition to Northern Manitoba that investigated the nutritional health status of First Nations peoples in the Cree communities of Norway House, Cross Lake, God's Lake Mine, Rossville and The Pas. Led by Dr. Percy Moore and Dr. Frederick Tisdall, the research mission was sponsored by Indian Affairs, Milbank Memorial Fund, Royal Canadian Air Force and Hudson's Bay Company. The goal of this initial survey was to investigate sustenance patterns and nutritional states of the Indigenous people in these communities by administering physical examinations, blood tests and X-rays on 400 residents.

Grave malnutrition was noted to the extent where many who continued to work were considered to be in need of medical attention. The malnutrition in the northern Cree communities was linked to other health problems, such as an increased tuberculosis death rate (1,400 per 100,000 people), compared to the non-Indigenous Manitoba population (27.1 per 100,000 people), high infant mortality (eight times the national rate), and higher crude mortality (five times the national rate).

In the years preceding the nutrition experiments, John Milloy, Mary-Ellen Kelm and other researchers regarded malnutrition as endemic in the residential schools and First Nations communities. For example, in the mid-1940s widespread malnutrition was discovered at Cecilia Jeffrey School and St. Mary's School in Kenora. At St. Mary's School, students were fed a flour mixture that was not legal under food adulteration law in Canada and at the Cecilia Jeffrey School, an experiment in nutrition education provided some students with nutrition supplementation and not others.

Recent food history research has indicated that the malnourishment of children at residential schools was intentional, evidenced by the Canadian government's awareness of malnutrition in residential school children before the experiments began. Other experiments with Indigenous children included deliberate withholding of milk rations to less than half the recommended amount for two years, providing some children with vitamins, iodine, and iron supplements but not others, the depression of vitamin B_{1} levels in students, and one school did not provide any supplements to any students in order to establish a baseline against the results collected from other schools.

In response to the results of the initial survey, an experiment was conducted among 300 malnourished Indigenous subjects, 125 of whom were provided any or all of the three nutritional supplements of interest: riboflavin, thiamine, or ascorbic acid. The experimental supplement group was compared to the malnourished group, which served as a control. The experiment was led by Moore and Tisdall, with the assistance of Dr. Cameron Corrigan, a resident physician in the Rossville Branch of the former Department of Indian Affairs.

== Studies ==
=== The James Bay Survey ===
The 1947–1948 James Bay Survey expanded on the previous Northern Manitoba study, and sought to investigate the connection between nutrition and health in Northern Canada. Two sets of researchers set out to investigate the nature and effects of food shortages among Native Canadians in the James Bay Area. The first included three anthropologists surveying various Indigenous communities and deciding upon two for further study – Attawapiskat First Nation, and the Cree Nation of Waskaganish. The second set of researchers included physicians, a dentist, a medical photographer and an X-ray technician to examine the health status of the two First Nations Communities. Dr. Percy Moore and Dr. Frederick Tisdall remained the primary researchers of the study. A primary goal of the study was to investigate "possible methods for augmenting or improving the food supplies of the Bush Indians".

In 1948, as a part of a press release promoting the nutritional study, Indian Affairs stated:

They have abandoned the native eating habits of their forefathers and adopted a semi-civilized, semi native diet which lacks essential food values, brings them to malnutrition and leaves them prey to tuberculosis and other disease. The white man, who unintentionally is responsible for the Indians' changed eating habits, now is trying to salvage the red man by directing him towards proper food channels ...

=== Residential school studies ===
Research projects focusing on the nutrition of Indigenous school children between 1948 and 1952 took place in six Canadian residential schools.

Prior assessments of food supply in the residential school system indicated a lack of sufficient food availability. An inspection was conducted in 1944 by Dr. A. B. Simes in a Manitoban Elkhorn residential school, finding that 28% of girls and 70% of boys who attended were reportedly underweight. A nutritionist determined the nutritional quality of food served at the Port Crosby residential school in British Columbia to have a "poor" rating score, with vegetables, cereals and meat reportedly underserved.

Medical professionals from the Red Cross and other organizations were responsible for assessing the food supply in these schools as well as the attitudes of the nearby Indigenous peoples living in reserves regarding the nourishment practices in the residential schools. Despite interference by many of these schools, a major food shortage was reported in these investigations.

In response, Dr. Lionel Bradley Pett, the leader of the Canadian Council on Nutrition at this time, led an initial survey that would investigate residential schools national and experiment with supplemented food items on students as subjects. In 1948, Pett began this five-year research project including 1000 Indigenous residential school students. These included:

- Blood's residential school (Alberta)
- St. Paul des Metis residential school (Alberta)
- St. Mary's residential school (Ontario)
- Cecilia Jeffrey residential school (Ontario)
- Shubenacadie residential school (Nova Scotia)
- Port Alberni residential school (British Columbia).

A research team of physicians, nurses, dentists and other medical professionals were tasked with assessing the health status of these Indigenous children (with blood tests, physical exams, etc.), as well as collecting data from school menus and administering tests for intelligence and aptitude, in order to inform experimental interventions to be implemented in each residential school for the studies that followed.

== Survivors' accounts ==
Alvin Dixon, a former student at the Alberni Residential School in British Columbia and a survivor of the nutrition experiments, played a key testimonial role in the Truth and Reconciliation Hearings to uncover the truth regarding the details of these experiments. On a CBC Radio One radio series titled As It Happens, Dixon provides the following account:

I arrived in Alberni Residential school in September, 1947. One of my only memories of that year was being presented in a classroom with, like, a spreadsheet, seven days a week, of mealtimes and we were asked to fill in breakfast lunch and dinner. What we ate in those particular meals, and the thing that struck me as a ten-year old was "Why were they asking me? They know what they're feeding us." They didn't ask us if they were eating these things... And we didn't always eat what was presented to us, obviously, because it was totally inadequate food, a lot of the times, and not necessarily the best tasting or the best quality... I remember having to, all of us kids having to, steal fruits, steal carrots, potatoes, so we could roast the potatoes somewhere offsite, you know, on a fire and eat it because we were never full when we left, like I said, the dining room table.

Ray Silver, another former residential school student at the same residential school in Alberni, British Columbia, describes his bleak experiences in the following statement to the Truth and Reconciliation Commission:

And us kids, we used to sneak from the school, we must have had to walk about a mile, sneak away from the school, sneak over the bridge, and go to that dump, and pick up apples, they were half rotten or something, and they threw out, they were no more good to sell, but us kids that were starving, we'd go there and pick that stuff up, fill up our shirts, and run back across the bridge, and go back to the school.

Ethel Johnson, former residential school student of the Shubenacadie school in Nova Scotia, illustrates her younger sister's struggles eating the unpalatable food served at the school:

And she couldn't eat it, and she started crying. And then she tried to make her eat it; and she couldn't. And then she threw up, and then she put her face in there. And she couldn't; when you're crying you can't eat anyway.

== Truth and Reconciliation Commission of Canada ==
The Truth and Reconciliation Commission (TRC) of Canada was officially established on June 1, 2008, with the purpose of documenting the history, harm, and ongoing impacts of the Canadian Indian residential school system on former students, their families and their communities. It provided residential school survivors an opportunity to share their experiences during public and private meetings held across the country.

The TRC emphasizes that it has a priority of displaying the impacts of the residential schools to the Canadians who have been kept in the dark from these matters.

== See also ==
- Canadian Indian residential school system
- List of Indian residential schools in Canada
- Chronic disease in Northern Ontario

== Notes on terminology ==
Retrieved from: Canadian Indian residential school system

1. Indian has been used because of the historical nature of the article and the precision of the name. It was, and continues to be, used by government officials, Indigenous peoples and historians while referencing the school system. The use of the name also provides relevant context about the era in which the system was established, specifically one in which Indigenous peoples in Canada were homogeneously referred to as Indians rather than by language that distinguishes First Nations, Inuit and Métis peoples. Use of Indian is limited throughout the article to proper nouns and references to government legislation.
2. Indigenous has been capitalized in keeping with the style guide of the Government of Canada. The capitalization also aligns with the style used within the final report of the Truth and Reconciliation Commission of Canada and the United Nations Declaration on the Rights of Indigenous Peoples. In the Canadian context, Indigenous is capitalized when discussing peoples, beliefs or communities in the same way European or Canadian is used to refer to non-Indigenous topics or people.
3. Survivor is the term used in the final report of the TRC and the Statement of apology to former students of Indian Residential Schools issued by Stephen Harper on behalf of the Government of Canada in 2008.
