= Yellow pea =

Yellow pea is a common name for several plants, and may refer to:

- Pisum sativum
- Lathyrus aphaca
- Lathyrus pratensis
