= Pablum =

Cereal brand for infants

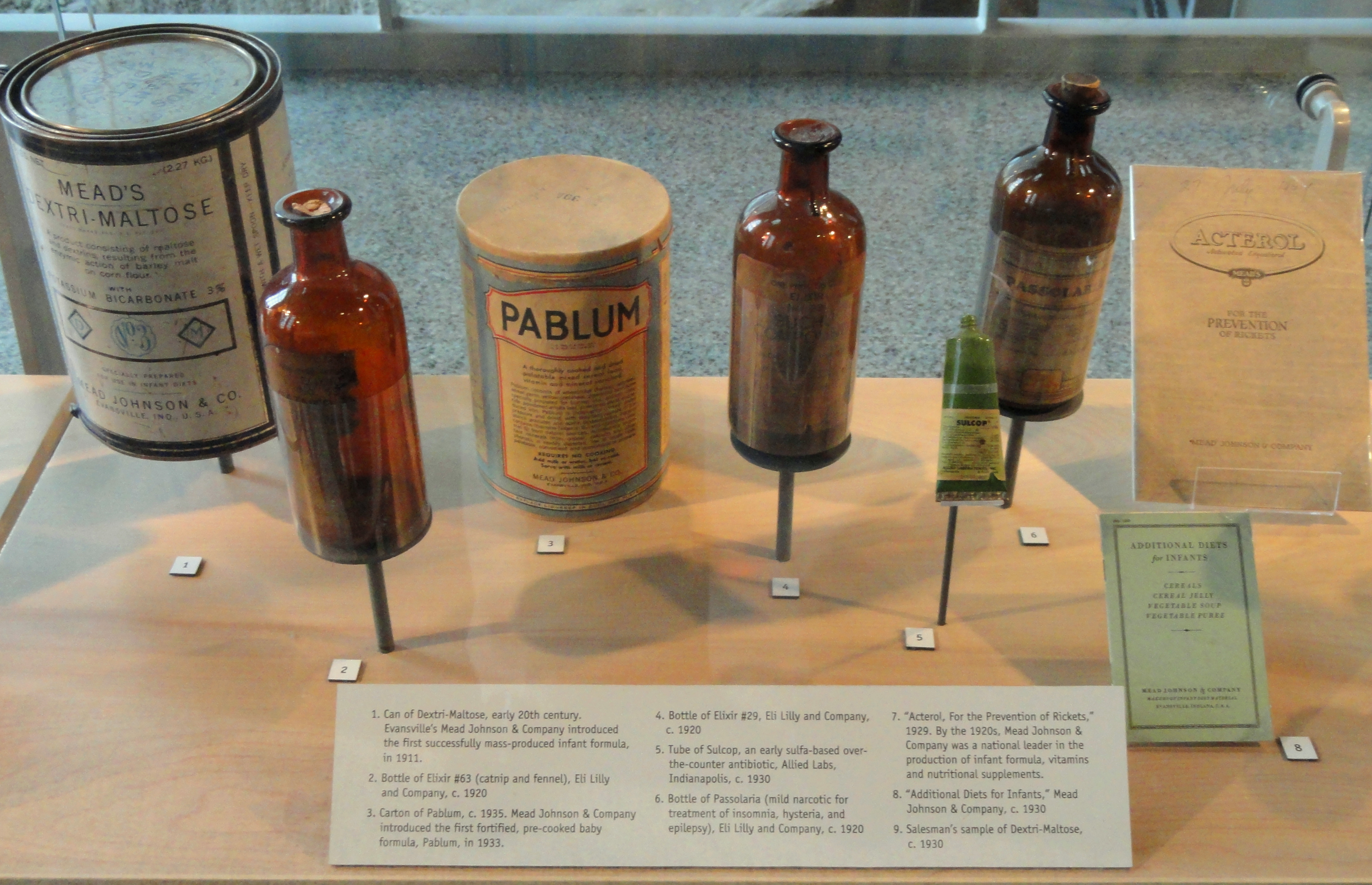
1935 can of Pablum (center left) exhibited at the Indiana State Museum, 2011

Pablum is a processed cereal for infants originally marketed and co-created by the Mead Johnson & Company in 1931. The product was developed at the Hospital for Sick Children in Toronto to combat infant malnutrition.

Developers of Pablum included Canadian pediatricians Frederick Tisdall, Theodore Drake, Pearl Summerfeldt, Alan Brown, laboratory technician Ruth Herbert (all of the Hospital for Sick Children in Toronto), and Mead Johnson chemist Harry H. Engel.

== Name ==
The trademarked name is a contracted form of the Latin word pabulum, which means "foodstuff". The word "pablum" had long been used in botany and medicine to refer to nutrition or substances of which the nutritive elements are passively absorbed. In a broader sense, "pablum" can refer to something bland, mushy, unappetizing, or infantile.

== Description ==
Pablum Mixed Cereal was made from a mixture of ground and precooked wheat (farina), oatmeal, yellow corn meal, bone meal, dried brewer's yeast, and powdered alfalfa leaf, fortified with reduced iron – providing an assortment of minerals and vitamins A, B_{1}, B_{2}, D, and E. Pablum is palatable and easily digested without causing side effects like diarrhea or constipation. It does not contain common allergens such as chicken eggs, lactose or nuts of any kind, while it does contain wheat and corn, which can be allergenic for some.

== History ==
Pablum was developed in 1930 by Canadian pediatricians Frederick Tisdall, Theodore Drake, and Alan Brown, in collaboration with nutrition laboratory technician Ruth Herbert (all of the Hospital for Sick Children in Toronto), along with Mead Johnson chemist Harry H. Engel. At the time, breast-feeding had declined in the middle and upper classes, with the effect that the diets of babies were often deficient in essential elements. The cereal marked a breakthrough in nutritional science: it helped prevent rickets, a crippling childhood disease, by ensuring that children had sufficient vitamin D in their diet. From the bone meal, it had about 12 ppm fluorine, which works out to about what pediatricians were prescribing about four decades later.

Although neither Pablum nor its biscuit predecessor was the first food designed and sold specifically for babies, it was the first baby food to come precooked and thoroughly dried. The ease of preparation made Pablum successful in an era when infant malnutrition was still a major problem in industrialized countries.

For 25 years (1930-1955), the Hospital for Sick Children and the Toronto Pediatric Foundation received a royalty payment on every package of Pablum sold. In 2005, the Pablum brand was acquired by the H. J. Heinz Company.

== See also ==
- Baby food
- Infant formula
- Breastmilk
- Genericized trademark
- List of Canadian inventions and discoveries
