= Cerealine =

Former American breakfast cereal

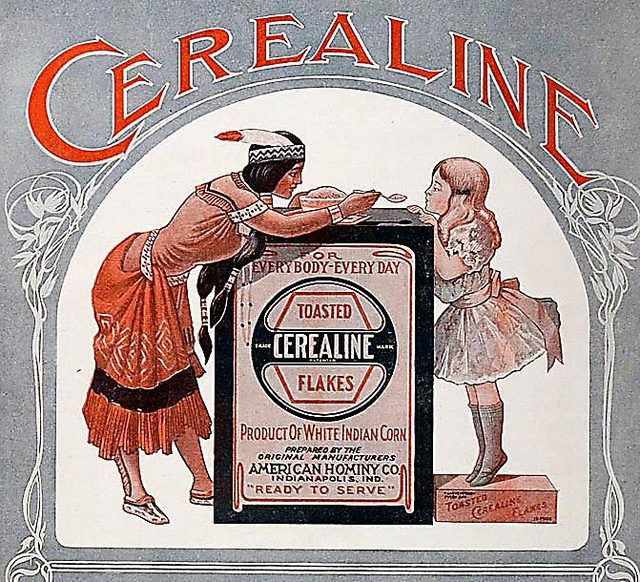
- American Hominy Co. advertisement for Toasted Cerealine Flake
- Place of origin: United States
- Region or state: Columbus, Indiana
- Created by: James Vannoy circa 1884 or 1887
- Main ingredients: Corn grits

Cerealine, also known as malt flakes, is an American cereal product originating in the 19th century. Similar to but predating corn flakes, which appeared in 1898 and are first rolled and then toasted, cerealine is corn grits in the form of uncooked flakes. It was originally used by the brewing industry.

More popularly, Toasted Cerealine Flakes, colloquially called simply Cerealine, was also the brand name for raw-flake cereal made from grits by the Cerealine Manufacturing Company of Indianapolis, Indiana, United States, and its successor concern, the American Hominy Company.

== History ==
Corn grits in the form of uncooked flakes, known as cerealine, was used for beer brewing as of at least the mid-19th century, with Aurora, Indiana's T. & J.W. Gaff & Co. distillery building the Cerealine Mill at 607 Jackson Street in Columbus, Indiana, in 1867. Their Cerealine Manufacturing Company moved to Indianapolis, Indiana, sometime prior to 1898, though the Columbus mill's building remained extant and was restored in the late 20th or early 21st century for use as a cafeteria and conference center by the engine manufacturing corporation Cummins Inc. Prior to being annexed by Indianapolis in 1895, the settlement around what was then called the Cerealine Works was known as Cerealinetown.

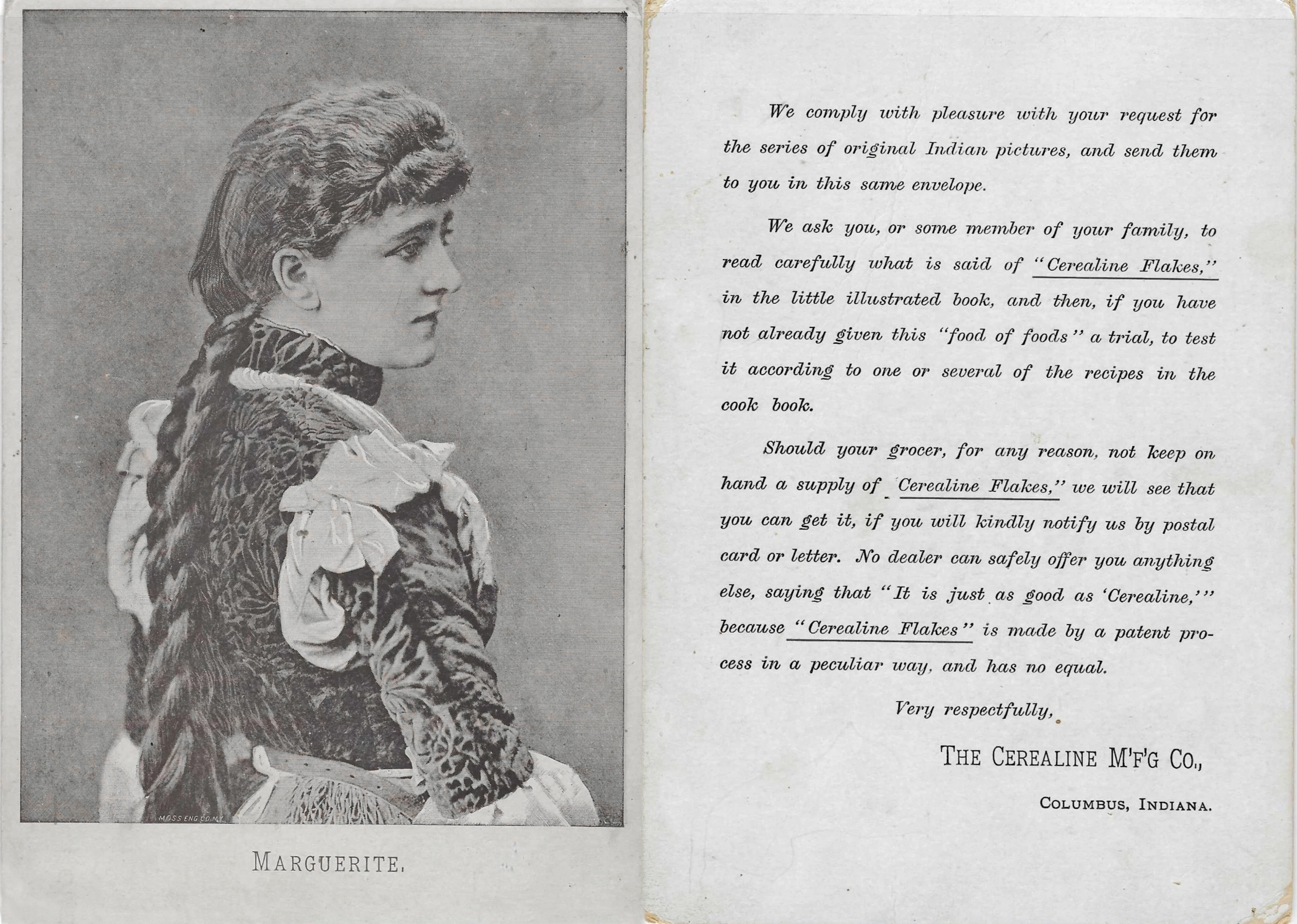
Cerealine trading card ("Marguerite"), late 19th century, Moss Engraving Co.

White-corn cerealine flakes as a breakfast cereal were invented, perhaps accidentally, by Columbus, Indiana, mill worker James Vannoy circa 1884 or 1887. Vannoy's 1902 obituary said he found through experimentation a way to run the milled grain through rollers so that it would come out "in thin layers or flakes. He went to his employer, Joseph F. Gent, with the discovery. Gent rather disregarded the wonderful discovery and told Vannoy that he had better been tending to his duties. Later, Gent had the discovery patented, and it was not long until Cerealine was on the market and was being sold in large quantities."

Cerealine was well established as a breakfast food by at least 1897, when the Illinois Farmer's Institute annual report noted that, "Some mills make hominy of white corn, roll it into broad, flat flakes, called cerealine, which are used here as a breakfast dish...." By this time it had become one of the three most popular cereals of that time, along with cracked wheat and oatmeal. All three were typically sold by retailers who bought cereal in barrel lots and scooped it out to sell by the pound to customers. Toasted Cerealine Flakes was later sold in packages.

In 1902, the Cerealine Manufacturing Company was consolidated with Indianapolis Hominy Mills; the Hudmet Company, of Missouri and Indiana; the Pratt Cereal Mill, of Decatur, Illinois; the Hamburg Milling Company and the Shellabarger Mill and Elevator Company, also of Decatur; the M.M. Wright Company, of Danville, Illinois; the Miami Maize Company, of Toledo, Ohio; and the Purity Oats Company, of Iowa, to form the American Hominy Company, based in Indianapolis.

A 1907 trade journal reported the company was reintroducing the cereal Toasted Cerealine Flakes, commenting that it would sound:

...familiar to the man who has a good memory. The American Hominy Co. is introducing this "new" flaked corn product in the East and the sale is going well. "Cerealine" will be remembered as an uncooked pure white cornflake sold several years ago all over the country. As a basis, "Cerealine" made some very appetizing dishes in its day. "Cerealine" enjoyed a wide sale, but its manufacture had to give way finally, we presume. to the increased production of ready prepared cereal foods. "Toasted Cerealine Flakes," or "Modern Cerealine"—if half as good as the old article, will no doubt meet with a cordial reception in this market when the time comes for its introduction.
