= Fiber One =

General Mills brand

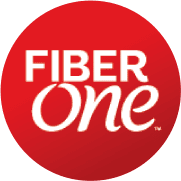

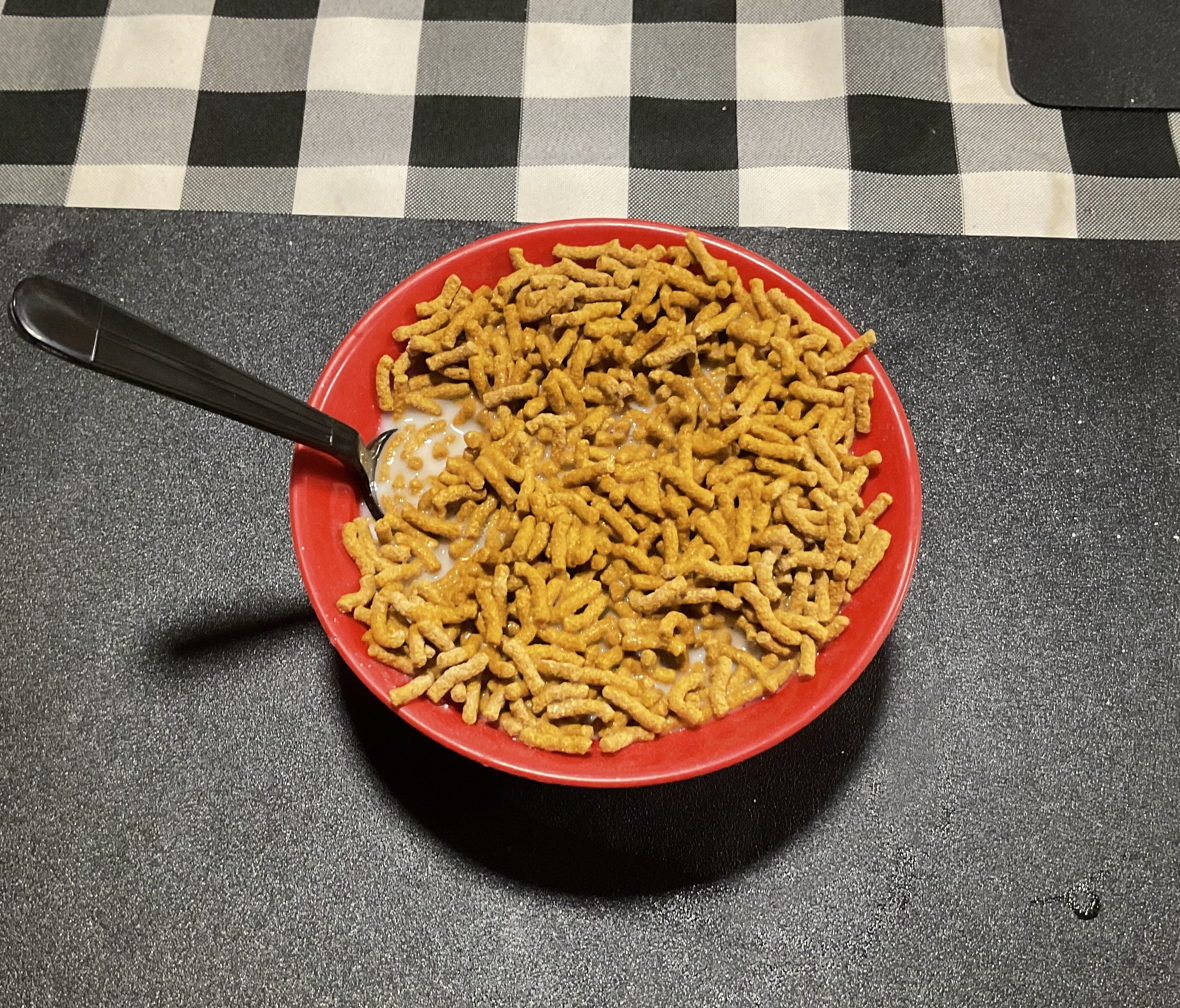
- Fiber One – Original Bran Cereal, with milk
- Product type: Breakfast cereal, snack and breakfast bars, brownies, bread, bread rolls, wraps
- Current owner: General Mills
- Introduced: 1985
- Related brands: Protein One
- Website: https://www.fiberone.com

Fiber One (marketed as Fibre One in the United Kingdom and Fibre 1 in Canada) is a brand of high-fiber breakfast cereal, packaged nutritional bars, and baked food products owned by General Mills. Originally released as a breakfast cereal in 1985, it directly competes with Kellogg’s All-Bran.

== History ==
It was introduced in 1985 as a breakfast cereal, resembling the shape and texture of the already released All-Bran Original cereal from Kellogg’s. General Mills released a second version of the cereal called “Fiber One Honey Clusters” in 2005. This cereal more resembled Post’s Honey Bunches Of Oats. The first line of Fiber One breakfast bars were then released in 2007. This was followed with an expansion of the brand, with yogurt, muffin and pancake mixes, and pastries being introduced under the brand.

In January 2014, General Mills released a high-protein granola version of the cereal under the name “Fiber One Protein”. This spin-off version of the cereal came in maple brown sugar and cranberry almond flavor varieties. In January 2019, General Mills debuted a spin-off to their Honey Clusters variety of Fiber One, calling it “Fiber One Strawberries & Vanilla Clusters”. The cereal was made using steel-cut oats and actual strawberries, which it advertised on each box.

The original cereal throughout previous decades has been viewed as a healthy option for children and adults among breakfast cereals, being labeled as more nutritious as other more sugary cereal options such as Cocoa Puffs in a 1989 consumer report.

Following the expansion of the brand, it was reported in 2010 that annual sales of the brand’s products had once exceeded 300 million dollars. In a 2011 survey of 50,000 consumers conducted by the Better Homes and Gardens Association, Fiber One’s 90 Calorie Chewy Bar released the year prior was voted the best new food product.

Fiber One currently has a sub-brand of packaged protein bars sold under the name “Protein One.”

== Marketing ==
Fiber One is marketed for consumers looking to increase their dietary fiber intake. On each cereal box, the percentage of the recommended value for daily fiber intake the cereal contains per serving is touted. The original version of the cereal is marketed to individuals seeking to reduce their sugar intake as well, touting zero grams of added sugar per serving on boxes in addition to its fiber content.

== Ingredients ==
Each of the brand’s products are created to contain one or more whole grain ingredients, these can include whole grain wheat, whole grain oat, whole grain rice, chicory root (inulin), or bran. This is done in order to boost the fiber content of the cereal, with the majority of fiber in the brand’s cereal products containing insoluble fiber.

To compensate for the lack of the presence of sugar in original Fiber One, it was initially sweetened with aspartame (also known by the brand name Equal), a non-nutritive artificial sweetener. Currently, some versions are sweetened with sucralose (also known by the brand name Splenda), another sugar substitute, and some have no artificial sweeteners.

== Varieties and products ==
Cereals

- Fiber One Original Bran Cereal
- Fiber One Caramel Delight
- Fiber One Frosted Shredded Wheat
- Fiber One Honey Clusters
- Fiber One Raisin Bran Clusters
- Fiber One Strawberries & Vanilla Clusters
- Fiber One 80: Chocolate
- Fiber One 80: Honey Squares
- Fiber One Bran
- Fiber One Protein: Cranberry Almond
- Fiber One Protein: Maple Brown Sugar

Bars

- Chocolate Peanut Butter
- Chocolate Caramel & Pretzel
- Chocolate
- Oats & Chocolate
- Caramel Nut Protein Bar

Packaged brownies and pastries

- Chocolate Fudge brownie
- Cinnamon Coffee Cake bar
- Birthday Cake bar
- Chocolate Chip Cookie brownie
- Strawberry Cheesecake bar
- Supreme Brownie Cookie Dough
- Supreme Brownie Triple Chocolate

== See also ==
- All-Bran
- List of breakfast cereals
