= Honey Loops =

Breakfast cereal made by Kellogg's

- Product type: Breakfast cereal
- Current owner: Kellogg's
- Country: U.K.
- Website: kelloggs.ie/honeyloops

Honey Loops is a breakfast product made by Kellogg's featuring honey-sweetened, loop-shaped pieces made predominantly from whole grain cereals including wheat, oat, barley, and rye. It is sold in many countries including Sweden, Spain, India, The Netherlands, Malta, Ireland, Italy, Germany, Russia, Belgium, France, and Poland. The mascot of Honey Loops was a male honeybee called Loopy, who has now been replaced by a female bee called Honey B (primarily as the mascot of Honey Pops). The cereal was originally marketed as "Honey Nut Loops", but the name was changed when nuts were dropped from the ingredients in 1998. The commercials for the original product explicitly mentioned the "crunchy nuts" it used to contain.

In Brazil, Argentina, and Chile the cereal was marketed as "Honey Nutos", but as of February 2015 it is no longer produced or sold. In Italy, France, Russia, and Spain the cereal is marketed as "Miel Pops" and it has also another version as honey-balls. In Austria, the cereal is called "Honey Bsss Loops". It was discontinued in India as well after years of production.

Every loop is filled with fun loads of honey!

— The advertising slogan for Honey Loops

== Miel Pops Commercial meme ==
In July 2020, the Miel Pops Russian intro became a viral Internet meme on TikTok featuring a dancing llama. The viral song is an edit of a cover of the Miel Pops theme by Armenian–Russian aspiring singer Rozalia in May 2020. Many Spanish speakers misinterpreted the lyrics from Russian, with many interpreting the word "Miel Pops" as "Mi Pan", Spanish for "My bread". Many from all over the world would use the sound with the dancing llama, referring to Miel Pops. The lyrics were "Miel Pops, Zoom Zoom Zoom, Zoom Zoom Zoom. Miel Pops ah kak vkysno Nyam Nyam Nyam." The sound is one of the most used to this day, used by popular tik-tokers Josephine Grey, Zander Hix & Julia Lindwall - all with a combined following of 75M followers.

== Ingredients ==
- Cereal Flours (Whole Oats, Whole Wheat, Whole Barley, Whole Rye, Corn)
- Sugar
- Honey (4.5%)
- Glucose Syrup
- Salt
- Tricalcium Phosphate
- Flavouring
- Niacin
- Iron
- Colour (mixed Carotenes)
- Vitamin B_{6}
- Riboflavin (B_{2})
- Thiamin (B_{1})
- Folic Acid
- Antioxidant (Ascorbyl Palmitate, Alpha Tocopherol)
- Vitamin B_{12}
