= S'more =

Confection of toasted marshmallow and chocolate

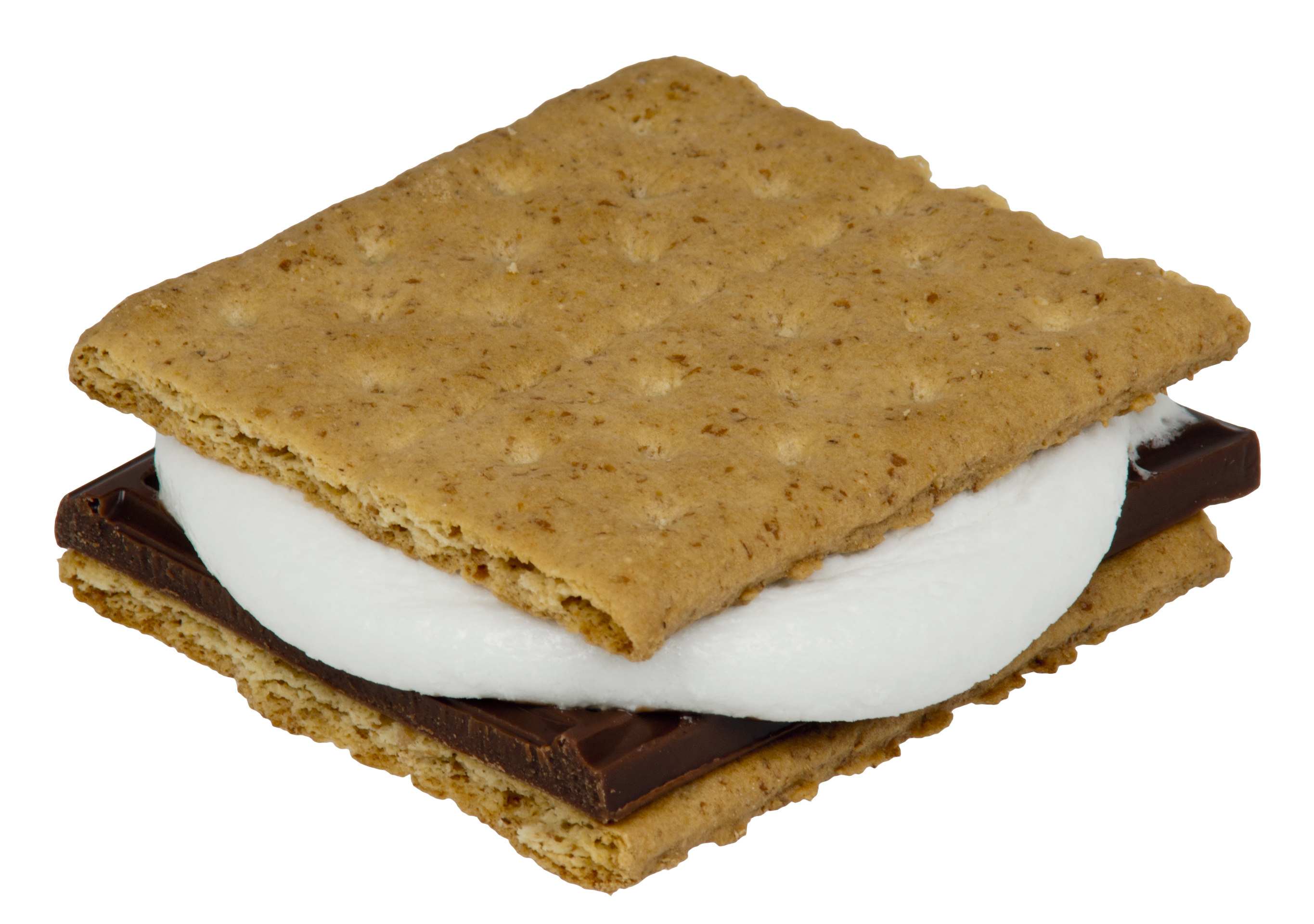
- A s'more made with graham cracker, marshmallow, and chocolate
- Place of origin: United States
- Main ingredients: Graham crackers, chocolate, marshmallows

A s'more (pronounced /ˈsmɔːr/, or /səˈmɔːr/) is a confection consisting of a toasted marshmallow and chocolate, sandwiched between graham crackers.

In a typical preparation, the marshmallow is toasted over a campfire, and the heat of the marshmallow melts the chocolate, fusing the sandwich together. At home or in restaurants, s'mores are prepared using a range of heating units, including broilers, grills and microwaves. Numerous variations exist that substitute the basic elements and add new ingredients. S'mores are also used as a flavor, in foods such as brownies and cupcakes, and in products such as Pop-Tarts.

The predecessor to the s'more is the Marshmallow Marguerite, a small confection of buttered marshmallow on a saltine cracker that became popular in the early 20th century. In some variations, graham crackers and melted chocolate were included. In the mid-1920s, records of Girl Scouts preparing "Some Mores" using the modern recipe appear, with the contraction s'more arising by the 1930s. More elaborate versions of s'mores came about in the 1990s, and today, s'mores are popular in the United States and Canada, where they are regarded as nostalgic.

== History ==
The precursor to s'mores (a contraction of the phrase "some more") is the Marshmallow Marguerite. These are small confections that typically consist of butter and marshmallow spread across a saltine cracker, and are toasted and served with hot chocolate or tea. Popularised by cookbooks and magazines published by the Boston Cooking School, variations published in newspapers and magazines included a 1910 variation using graham crackers as a base, and a 1913 variation with a layer of melted chocolate below the marshmallow. Later in 1913, a commercial version was released by National Biscuit Company under the name "Nabisco Mallowmars", and in 1917, Moon Pie went on the market as another marshmallow and chocolate combination.

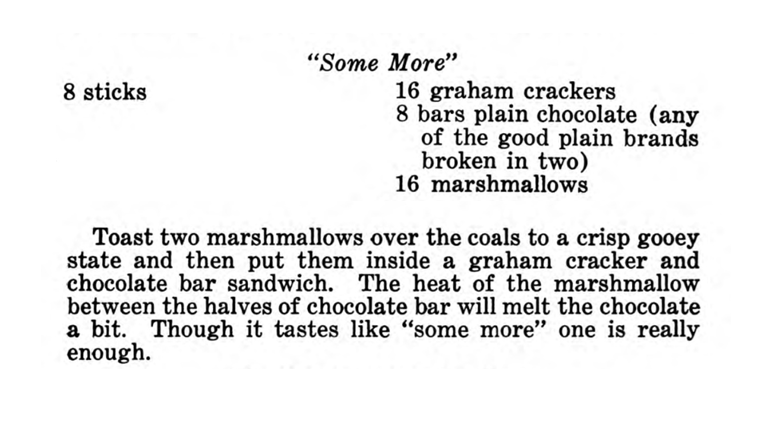
1927 recipe for "Some More" in Girl Scouts of America cookbook

By the mid-1920s, descriptions were being published of s'mores being eaten in a camping setting. Roasting marshmallows on a fire was well established in the US by this time, with reports appearing in the New York Times as early as 1902 attesting to the popularity of the practice at "marshmallow parties". In 1925, a Connecticut newspaper described Girl Scouts eating "Some-mores" as, "a graham cracker on which is placed a piece of Hershey chocolate, a toasted marshmallow, another piece of chocolate and a graham cracker".

Food writer Stella Parks identifies the setting as particularly appropriate for a crumbly and sticky, dripping confection, where it could be eaten "with abandon". Alternate versions eaten by Girl Scouts at this time included s'mores substituting apples for graham crackers, and peanut butter for chocolate. Marguerites continued to be eaten and were popular through the 1930s among women's luncheons and teas, served open-faced and without chocolate. Sometimes, a candied cherry was placed in the center as it came out from under the broiler. By the end of the decade, "some more" had been contracted to "s'mores".

In the 1990s, s'mores became popular among American adults, and elaborate versions appeared in restaurants, dressed with a raspberry coulis and intended to be eaten with cutlery. A s'mores martini was also invented during this time, made with white chocolate and vanilla liqueurs. Food historian Linda Civitello attributes this to Americans in the baby boomer generation turning from low-fat foods and exercise to comfort foods as they aged, with s'mores a food reminiscent of their 1950s childhoods.

== Description ==
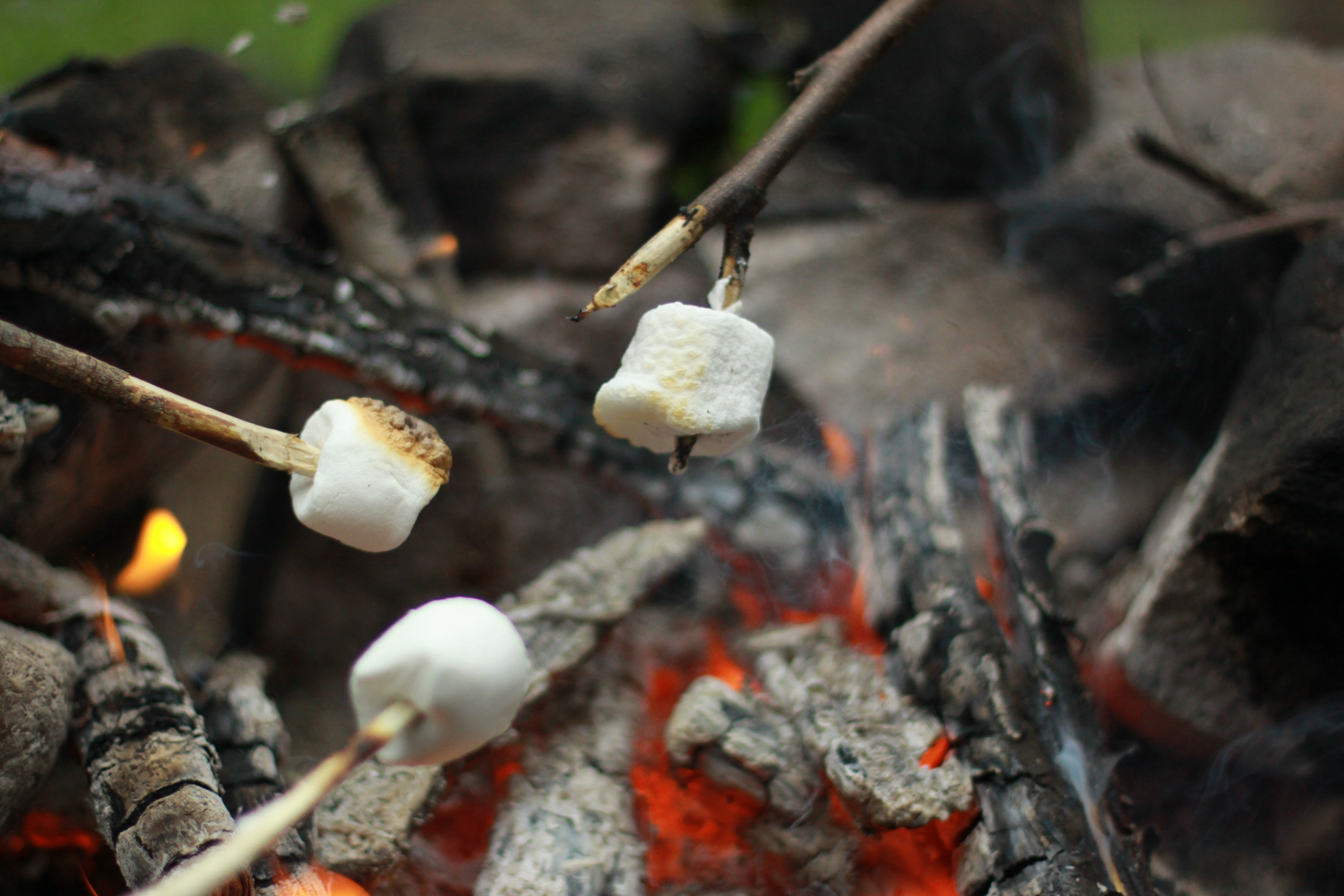
Marshmallows cooking over a fire

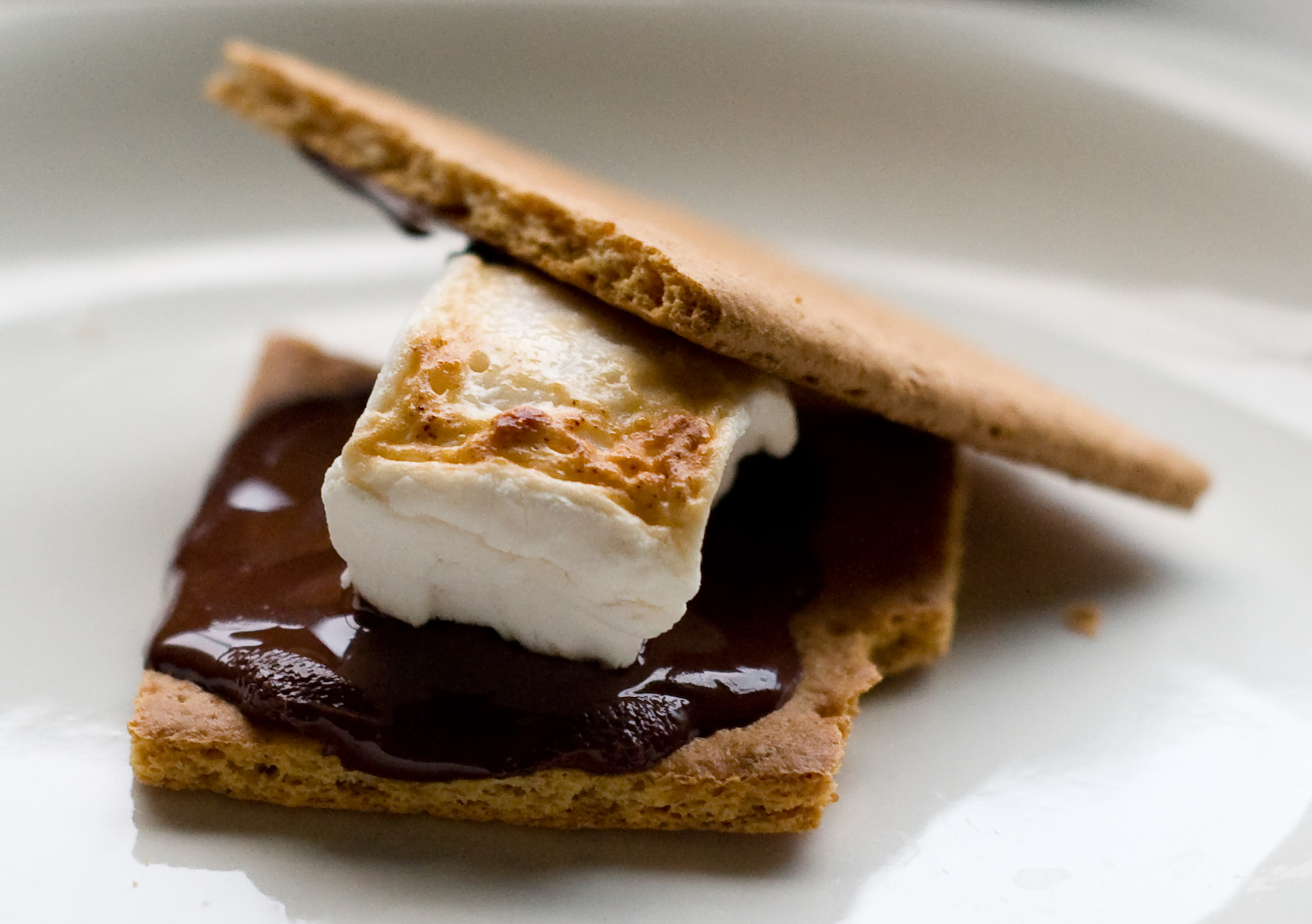
Vegetarian, homemade s'mores

A basic s'more is prepared by roasting a marshmallow on a fire, rotating it to produce an even cook, and placing it between graham crackers with a thin piece of chocolate. For a few seconds, the s'more is allowed to sit—as it's close to the heat of the marshmallow, the chocolate melts, adding adhesiveness to the already sticky marshmallow. Together, they hold the s'more collectively. Preferences for how toasted the marshmallow should be vary from lightly cooked to a dark char. The element of fire sometimes produces burns to the hands. Away from a campfire, s'mores are sometimes prepared under a broiler, microwave, grill, or at the table in restaurants furnished with hibachi grills.

Numerous variations are made by swapping elements, such as graham crackers for ginger snap, saltines or potato chips, marshmallow for Peeps, and chocolate for Reese's Peanut Butter Cups. More elaborate versions are prepared by some pastry chefs, making their own marshmallows to be paired with graham crackers, and with chocolate they consider high quality. One such version created by New York-based pastry chef Dominique Ansel used Speculoos as the cookie, salt, and a "maple-infused whiskey ganache" for the chocolate. When ordered, a honey-flavored marshmallow was cooked with a blow-torch.

S'mores are associated by many Americans with childhood memories of preparing the confection around a campfire in the summer. For several food writers, this nostalgia is described as more valuable than the flavor; Amy Scattergood, writing for the Los Angeles Times, describes s'mores as "waxy chocolate, stale Graham crackers, [and] bits of gooey carbon", and a blogger quoting in the New York Times describes a very sweet flavor that becomes less appealing as an adult. In the United States, August 10 is designated "National S'Mores Day". Outside the US, s'mores are a popular confection among Canadian campers.

In several iterations of modern sweets, including ice cream, brownies, and cupcakes, s'more appears as a flavoring. Other versions sold by restaurants and cafés include blondies, dessert burritos and empanadas. Corporations have also produced s'mores flavored products, such as Kellogg's s'mores Pop-Tarts and Hershey's chocolate cookies, and in 2017, the Girl Scouts released s'mores cookies in two varieties: crispy and crunchy.

== See also ==
- Banana boat
- Choco pie
- Nanaimo bar
- Smorz
