= Country store (disambiguation) =

Country store may refer to:

- A general store in a rural setting such as a village
- Country Store, an American bluegrass band, had the only U.S. charting hit, "To Love You"
- Country Store (muesli), a muesli-based breakfast cereal
