= All-Bran =

Breakfast cereal made by WK Kellogg Co

- Product type: Breakfast cereal
- Current owner: WK Kellogg Co (US, Canada, Caribbean); Kellanova (rest of world)
- Country: United States
- Introduced: 1916; 110 years ago
- Previous owners: Kellogg's (1916-2023)
- Website: all-bran.com

All-Bran is a high-bran, high-fibre, wheat bran breakfast cereal manufactured by WK Kellogg Co for the North American market and Kellanova for the rest of the world. It is marketed as an aid to digestive health.

== History ==
The introduction of All-Bran in 1916 came on the heels of the success of Kellogg's Bran Flakes a year earlier. It was sold in a red and green box, similar to most Kellogg's cereals at the time. After finding great success in the U.S. market, Kellogg's began distribution in the United Kingdom and other markets in 1922.

The recipe was reformulated in 2025.

== Advertising ==
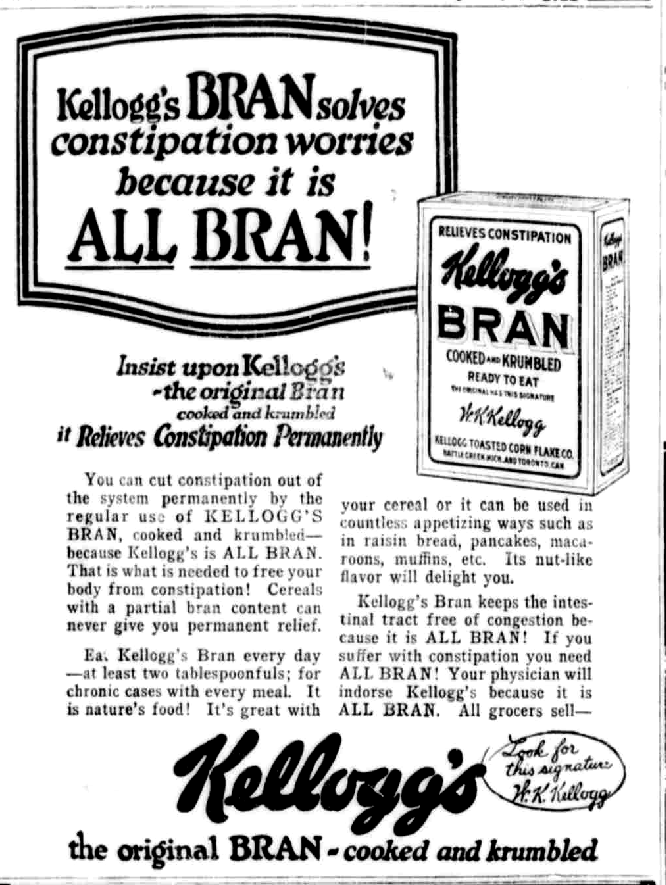
1922 newspaper ad for "Kellogg's Bran", precursor to All-Bran

With the rising popularity of patent medicine in advertising, The Kellogg Company of Canada published a book named A New Way of Living that would show readers "how to achieve a new way of living; how to preserve vitality; how to maintain enthusiasm and energy; how to get the most out of life because of a physical ability to enjoy it." It touted the All-Bran cereal as the secret to leading "normal" lives free of constipation.

== Ingredients ==
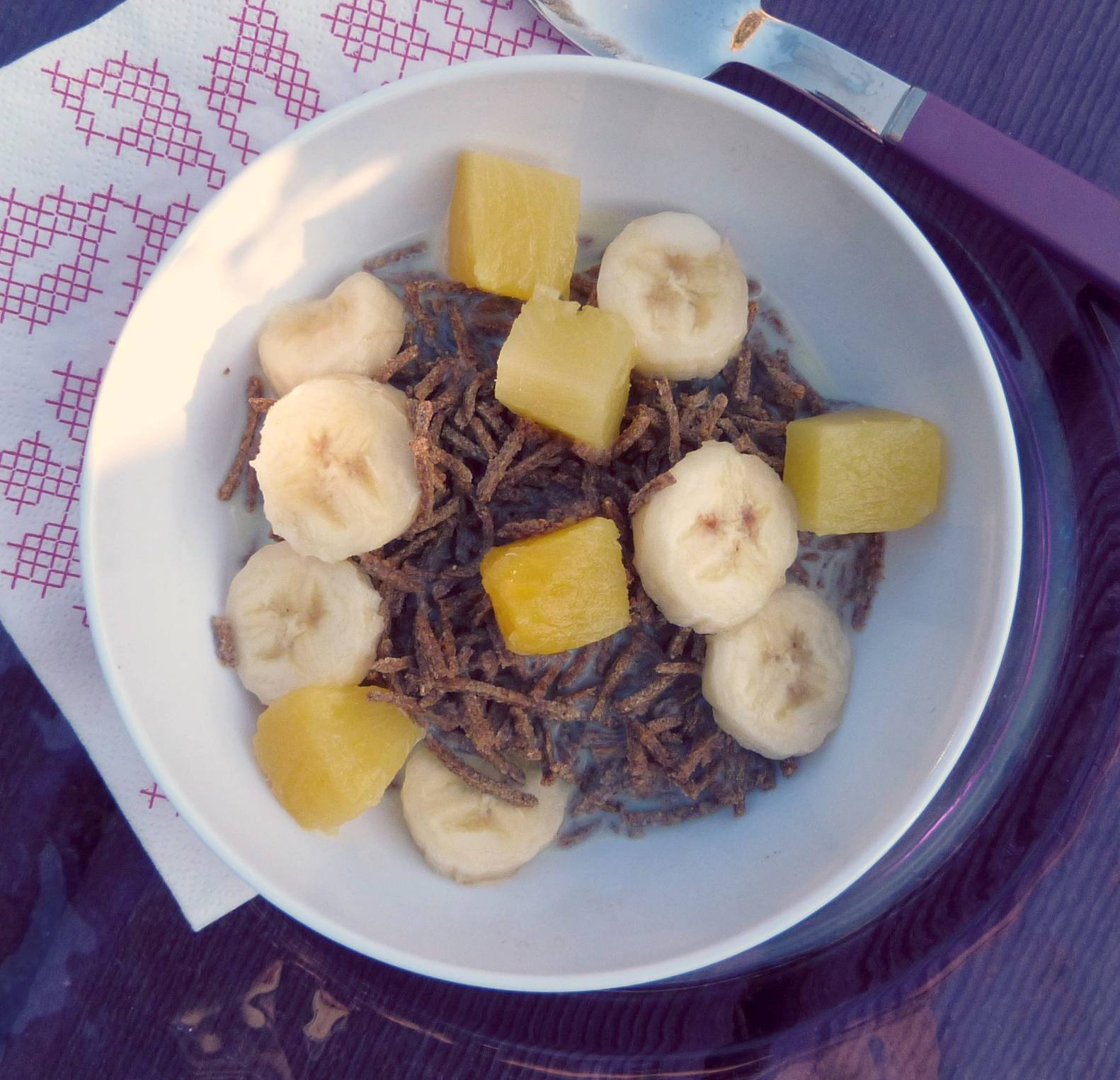
A bowl of All-Bran served with milk, and added banana and pineapple pieces

The current ingredients of All-Bran Original are wheat bran, sugar, corn and barley malt extract, salt, and the following added vitamins and minerals: iron, thiamine hydrochloride (vitamin B1), d-calcium pantothenate (vitamin B5), pyridoxine hydrochloride (vitamin B6), and folic acid.

It contains 33% fiber, 78% of natural wheat bran's 43%. The second highest ingredient, after wheat bran, is sugar (18%).

All-Bran Buds is similar with added psyllium; its 39% fiber analysis is close to that of natural wheat bran.

Despite the name, the principal ingredient in All-Bran Flakes is whole grain wheat, not bran. It contains only 15% fiber, equivalent to 34% wheat bran.

All-Bran received five stars out of five on the Australian Government's health star ratings.

== Varieties ==
All-Bran comes in different varieties; many are available to specific countries:

- All-Bran Original (Australia, Canada, France, Indonesia, Ireland, Italy, Japan, Latin America, South Africa, UK, U.S.)
- All-Bran Bran Flakes/All-Bran Flakes/Petales (Australia, Belgium, Canada, France, Indonesia, Ireland, Italy, The Netherlands, Portugal, Spain, UK)
- All-Bran Bran Buds (Canada, U.S.)
- All-Bran Strawberry Buds (Canada)
- All-Bran Strawberry Medley (Canada, U.S.)
- All-Bran Extra Fiber/All-Bran Plus (Belgium, Denmark, Finland, France, Malta, the Netherlands, Norway, Portugal, South Africa, Spain, Sweden,)
- All-Bran Flakes Chocolate (Italy, Spain)
- All-Bran Guardian (Canada)
- All-Bran Honey Nut Flavor (Canada, South Africa)
- All-Bran Cereal Bars (Belgium, Canada, Italy, Portugal, South Africa, Spain, UK)
- All-Bran Choco/Chocolat (Belgium, France, The Netherlands, Spain, UK)
- All-Bran Splitz (Spain)
- All-Bran Plus (Belgium, Greece, The Netherlands)
- All-Bran Plus Yogur/Iogurte (Portugal, Spain)
- All-Bran Plus Fruit 'n Fibre/Fruta & Fibra (Belgium, France The Netherlands, Portugal)
- All-Bran Figue & Pomme (France)
- All-Bran Fruit 'n Oats (Australia)
- All-Bran Tropical (Australia)
- All-Bran Snack Bites (Canada, U.S.)
- All-Bran Dual (Australia)

=== Discontinued varieties ===
- All-Bran Complete Oat Flakes cereal
- All-Bran Complete Wheat Flakes cereal
- All-Bran Extra Fiber cereal
- All-Bran Yogurt Bites

== See also ==
- Fiber One
- List of breakfast cereals
