= Smorz =

Breakfast cereal made by Kellogg's

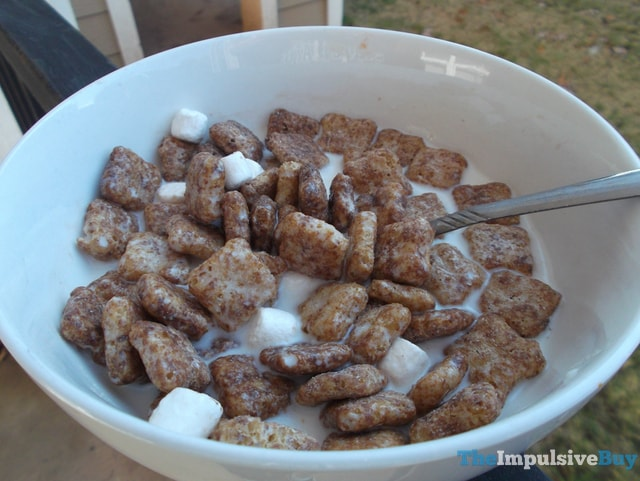
- Kellogg's Smorz – Natural and Artificially Flavored Puffcorn Cereal with Marshmallows, in milk
- Product type: Breakfast cereal
- Produced by: Kellogg's
- Introduced: 2003; 23 years ago (reintroduced in 2015 and 2021)
- Discontinued: 2013 and 2019
- Related brands: Krave S'mores
- Markets: United States
- Website: https://www.kelloggs.com/en_US/products/smorz-original.html

Smorz is a breakfast cereal manufactured by the Kellogg Company, consisting of chocolate graham-flavored puffed corn squares and marshmallows, modeled after the flavor of s'mores.

== Description and history ==
This breakfast cereal is described on the box as a "rich chocolatey graham cereal with marshmallows". The description of the cereal on the official Kellogg's website states that Smorz are "...crunchy graham crackers in a rich chocolatey coating with – of course – sweet marshmallows!" Although Kellogg's originally used plain white marshmallows for this cereal, Smorz currently contains marshmallows that are brown and white, intending to look like chocolate has been swirled into them.

The cereal was first released in 2003, but was discontinued in December 2013, intending to be replaced by a new s'mores-flavored Krave cereal. It was announced in December 2015 that Smorz would be reintroduced, and it was re-discontinued in April 2019.

On December 15, 2020, it was confirmed that Smorz will return again to store shelves, in response to a petition on the website Change.org and public campaigning on social media. It was reintroduced to markets for a second time in January 2021.

At the height of production, thousands of pounds of chocolate cream and marshmallows were used each day to make Kellogg's Smorz.

== Criticisms ==
Smorz has undergone negative scrutiny surrounding its sugar content during its run. One serving (which is 41 grams or about 1.25 cups) of this cereal contains 18 total grams of sugar, with 17 grams of the total sugar being added sugar. This has led to the cereal being ranked by many media sources as one of the worst breakfast cereals for consumers in regards to sugar content with approximately 43.3% of the cereal by weight being sugar.

The cereal has also been a target of complaint and opposition by food advocacy groups. In 2004, The Center for Science in the Public Interest (CSPI) sent a letter to National Geographic Society, calling for the removal of Hostess and Smorz advertisements in National Geographic Kids magazine stating "It is unconscionable that the National Geographic Society...has chosen to cram National Geographic Kids magazine with advertisements for sugary cereals, candy and snack foods."
