= Country Store =

Breakfast cereal made by Kellogg's

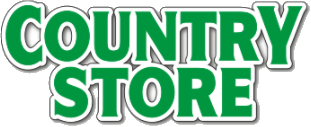

- Product type: Muesli
- Current owner: Kellogg's
- Country: U.K.
- Introduced: 1974; 52 years ago
- Markets: Europe
- Website: kelloggs.co.uk/countrystore

Country Store is a variety of muesli manufactured by Kellogg's. It is high in fibre and available only in the European Union. It is not sold in the United States due to its higher production cost compared to processed artificial cereals such as Froot Loops and Apple Jacks. Country Store was introduced into the United Kingdom and Ireland around 1974 with a TV advert voiced by Michael Jayston.

== Ingredients ==
Country Store contains a number of natural ingredients, including Oats, Maize, Wholewheat, Brown Sugar, Sultanas (8.5%), Milk Whey Powder, Sugar, Wheat Bran, Hazelnuts (1.5%), Dried Apple (1%), Barley Malt Flavouring, Salt, Honey, Vitamins & Minerals: Niacin, Iron, Vitamin B6, Vitamin B2 (Riboflavin), Vitamin B1, (Thiamin), Folic Acid, Vitamin B12, Vitamin D.
