= Just Right =

Breakfast cereal made by Kellogg's

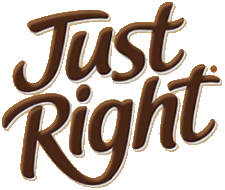

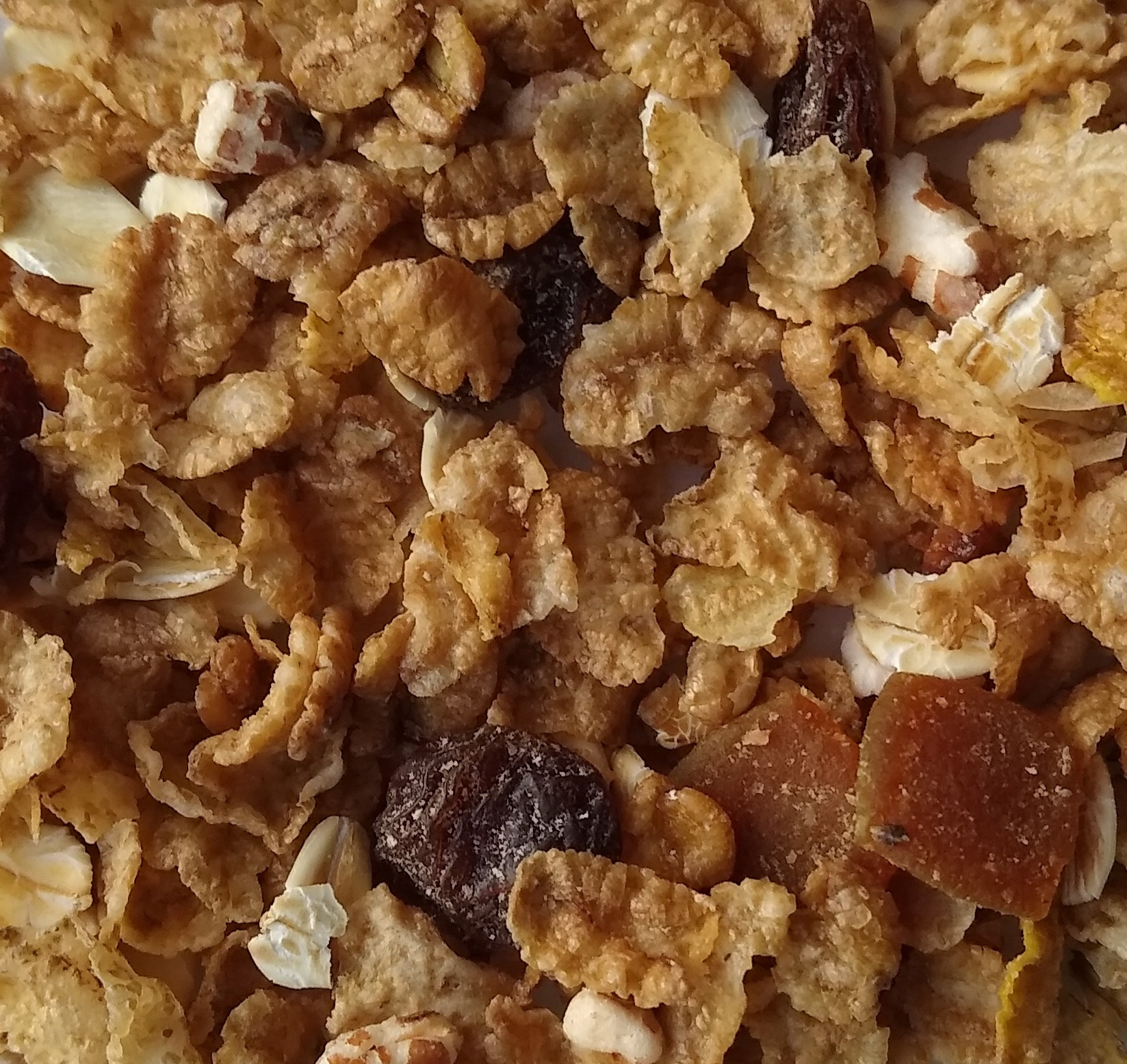
- Product type: Breakfast cereal
- Current owner: Kellogg's
- Country: Australia
- Introduced: 1982; 44 years ago
- Website: kelloggs.com.au/justright

Just Right is a breakfast cereal produced by Kellogg's. It was introduced in 1982 intended for health-conscious, athletic Australians, who are the world's third-biggest cereal eaters. The cereal is sold in Iceland, Ireland, New Zealand and Australia but has been discontinued in other markets, including the United Kingdom. A Canadian Just Right cereal, also manufactured by Kellogg's but with somewhat different ingredients, was available in Canada from 1985 to 2021.

Just Right is composed of whole wheat, corn, and rice flakes, with raisins (sultanas in Australia), date nuggets and sliced almonds. It is also labelled as vitamin-fortified and low-fat.

An early commercial for the cereal when sold in the United States has become an internet viral video due to it featuring a then-unknown Tori Amos.

== Nutritional information ==
Just Right received four stars out of five on the Australian Government's health star ratings.

The following information was taken from a Kellogg's Just Right cereal box in July 2007, with a box top date of SEP 20, 2007 (KCB 014).

Attribute	Value / %Daily Value
Serving Size	3/4 Cup (53g/1.9oz)
Servings Per Container	About 9
Calories	200
Calories from Fat	20
Total Fat 2g	3%
Saturated Fat 0g	0%
Trans Fat 0g	
Cholesterol 0 mg	0%
Sodium 240 mg	10%
Potassium 140 mg	4%
Total Carbohydrate 43g	14%
Dietary Fiber 3g	11%
Sugars 13g	
Other Carbohydrate 27g	
Protein 4g	
Vitamin A	10%
Vitamin C	0%
Calcium	2%
Iron	50%
Vitamin D	10%
Vitamin E	75%
Thiamin	75%
Riboflavin	25%
Niacin	25%
Vitamin B_{6}	100%
Folic Acid	100%
Vitamin B_{12}	100%
Phosphorus	10%
Magnesium	6%
Zinc	4%
Copper	4%

== Pop culture ==
- Tori Amos was featured in a 1980s commercial promoting the brand.

== See also ==
- List of almond dishes
