= Bran Buds =

Breakfast cereal made by Kellogg's

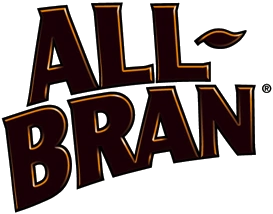
- Product type: Breakfast cereal
- Current owner: Kellogg Company
- Country: U.S.
- Website: kelloggs.com/allbranbuds

All-Bran Buds is a variety of All-Bran cereal manufactured by Kellogg's. It is a wheat bran cereal that is a source of high fiber and psyllium. It is available in the United States and Canada.

It used to be available in the United Kingdom during the 1970s and 1980s. The cereal was available in Ireland until the mid-1980s.

== Nutrition ==
A serving of 1/3 cup (30 g) has 70 calories (293 kJ), 1 g of fat, 24 g of carbohydrates, 7 g sugar, and 2g of protein. It contains 13 g of fiber (3 g soluble, 10 g insoluble).

== Ingredients ==
Wheat bran, sugar/glucose-fructose, psyllium seed husks, corn bran (USA only), salt, baking soda, natural colour, vitamins (USA only, thiamin hydrochloride, d-calcium pantothenate, pyridoxine hydrochloride, folic acid, iron), BHT.

All-Bran Buds is both Kosher and Halal.
