= Kellogg Breakfast Council =

The Kellogg Breakfast Council was an organization made up of nutrition experts, whose stated purpose on the Kellogg's cereal company website was to provide independent nutrition advice to the company. Council members included a professor of nutrition, a pediatrician, as well as several dietitians.

== History ==
The Breakfast Council was formed in 2011, after a survey carried out by the Kellogg company showed that only 34% of Americans ate breakfast. Its members were described on the Kellogg website as "independent experts". A press release from the company described them as "third party" nutrition experts, who would give nutrition advice to the company and provide information to the public about the benefits of eating a healthy breakfast.

The Council members taught a continuing education class for dietitians, and published an academic paper about cereal nutrition. They also suggested changes to the government's dietary guidelines and made positive comments on social media and other online forums about cereal. Kellogg included comments from these experts in cereal commercials.

In 2016, the Associated Press uncovered emails and a copy of a contract showing that the council's members were paid by Kellogg. The average annual compensation was $13,000, and the contract prohibited them from working for Kellogg's competition. The members were provided with a toolkit which included suggested wording for social media posts about cereal. The council members' relationship with Kellogg was not always revealed when the posts were made.

In May 2016, the council members' contracts expired, and the council ceased to operate.
