= Fruit Loops =

Fruit Loops or Froot Loops may refer to:

- Froot Loops, a brand of cereal
- FruityLoops, a software music mixer
- Fruit Loops (also known as Freedom Rings), multicolored rings worn as necklaces, bracelets, etc. to symbolize gay pride
- Fruit (slang) § Fruit Loops, various slang definitions
