= Krave (cereal) =

Breakfast cereal made by Kellogg's

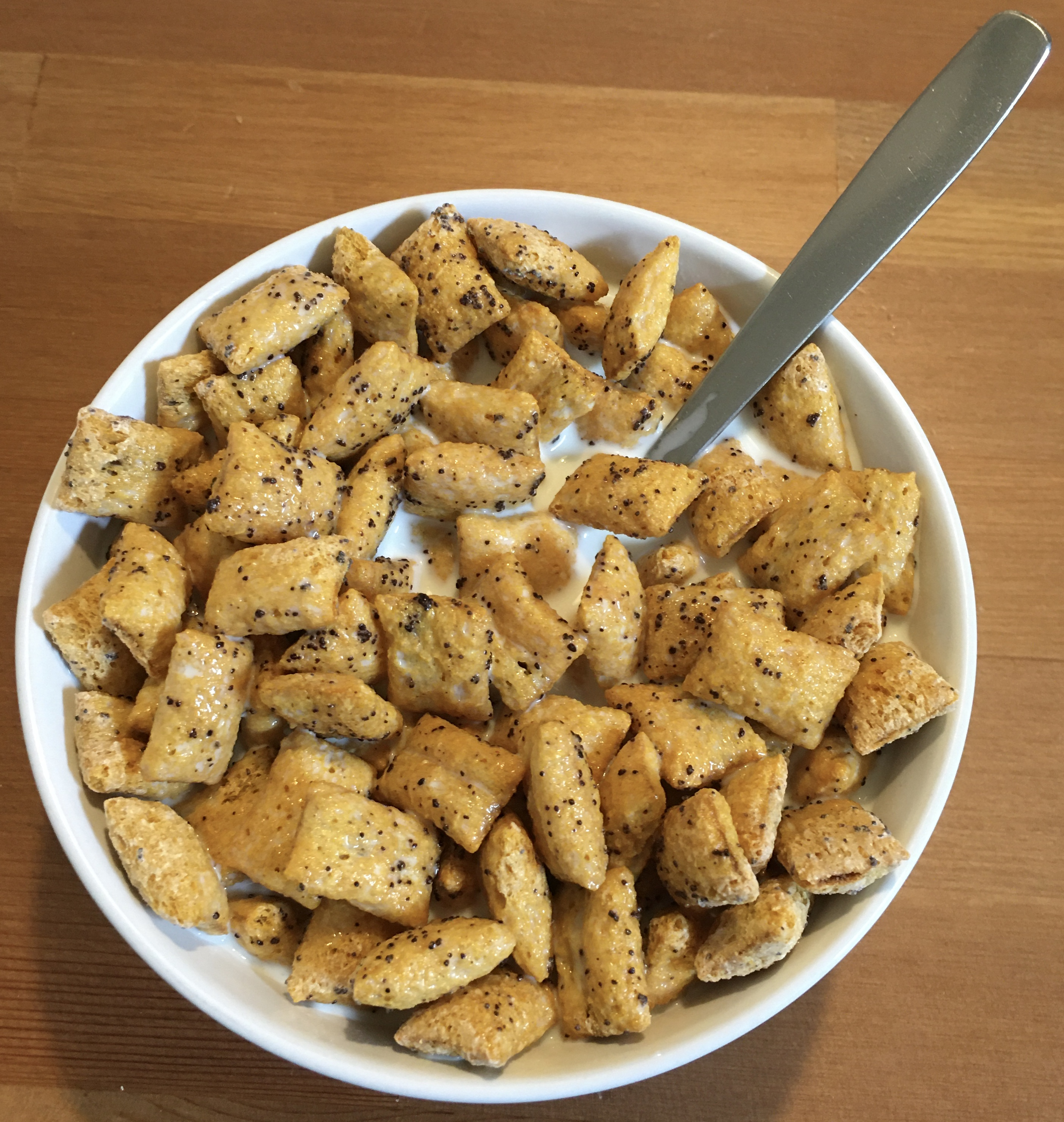
- Kellogg's Krave – Crispy Cookie Dough Flavored Shell Outside, Smooth Chocolate Inside, with milk
- Product type: Breakfast cereal
- Current owner: Kellanova (rest of the world); WK Kellogg Co (North America)
- Country: United Kingdom; Other countries
- Introduced: 2010; 16 years ago
- Previous owners: Kellogg's (2010-2025)
- Website: kelloggs.com/krave

Krave is a chocolate cereal made by Kellogg's. It was launched in the United Kingdom in 2010.

It was introduced in the United States in 2012. In India, the cereal is marketed as "Kellogg's Chocos Fills".

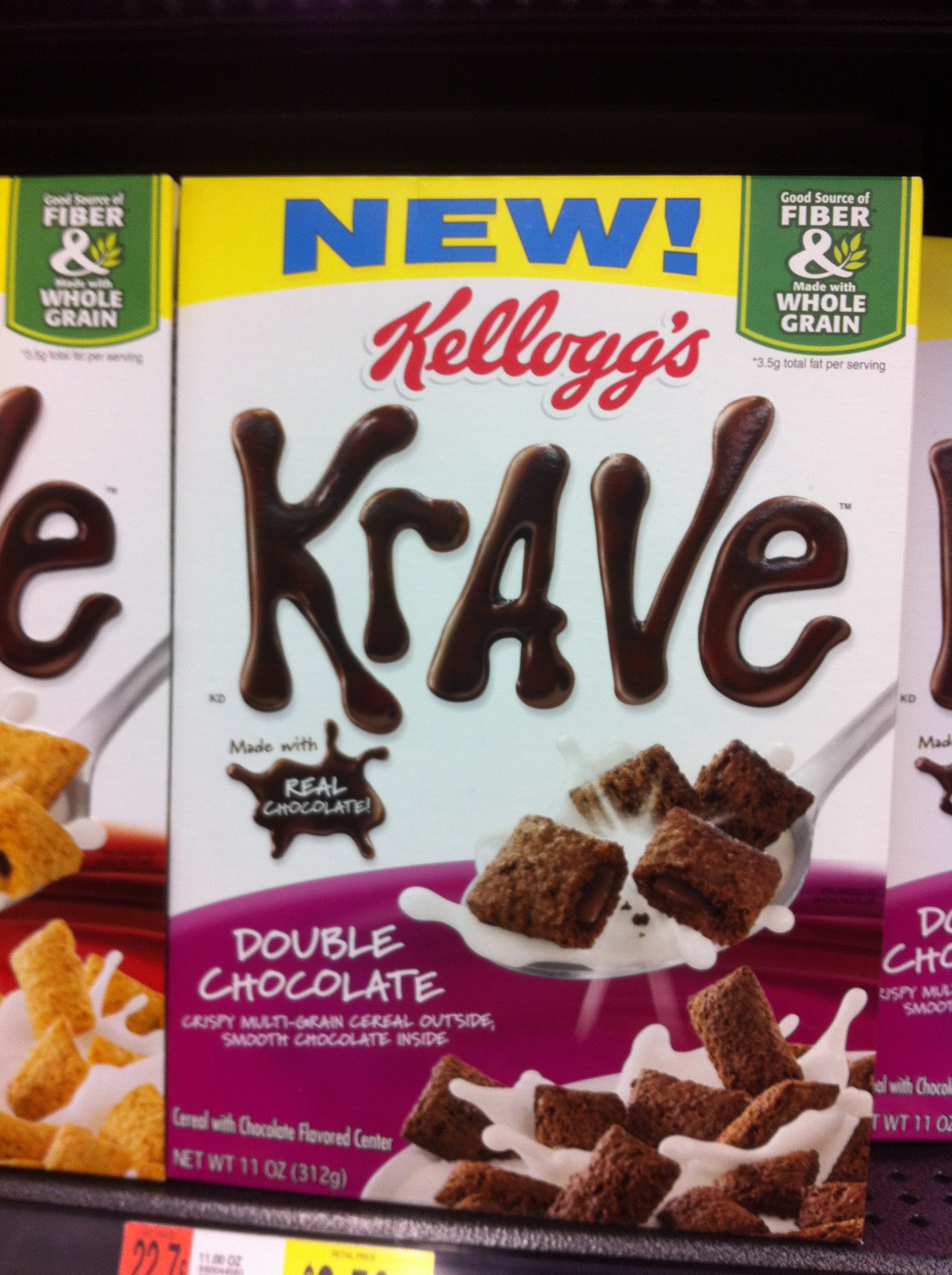
A box of Kellog's Krave Double Chocolate cereal.

== Krave Challenge ==
Starting around 2013, Kelloggs started an online marketing campaign known as the Krave Challenge, where vloggers and YouTubers would be sent a package in the mail giving them a unique and intricate challenge revolving around trying to eat a bowl of Krave cereal. The campaign was heavily praised for its originality and won multiple awards.
