= Corn Pops =

Breakfast cereal made by Kellogg's

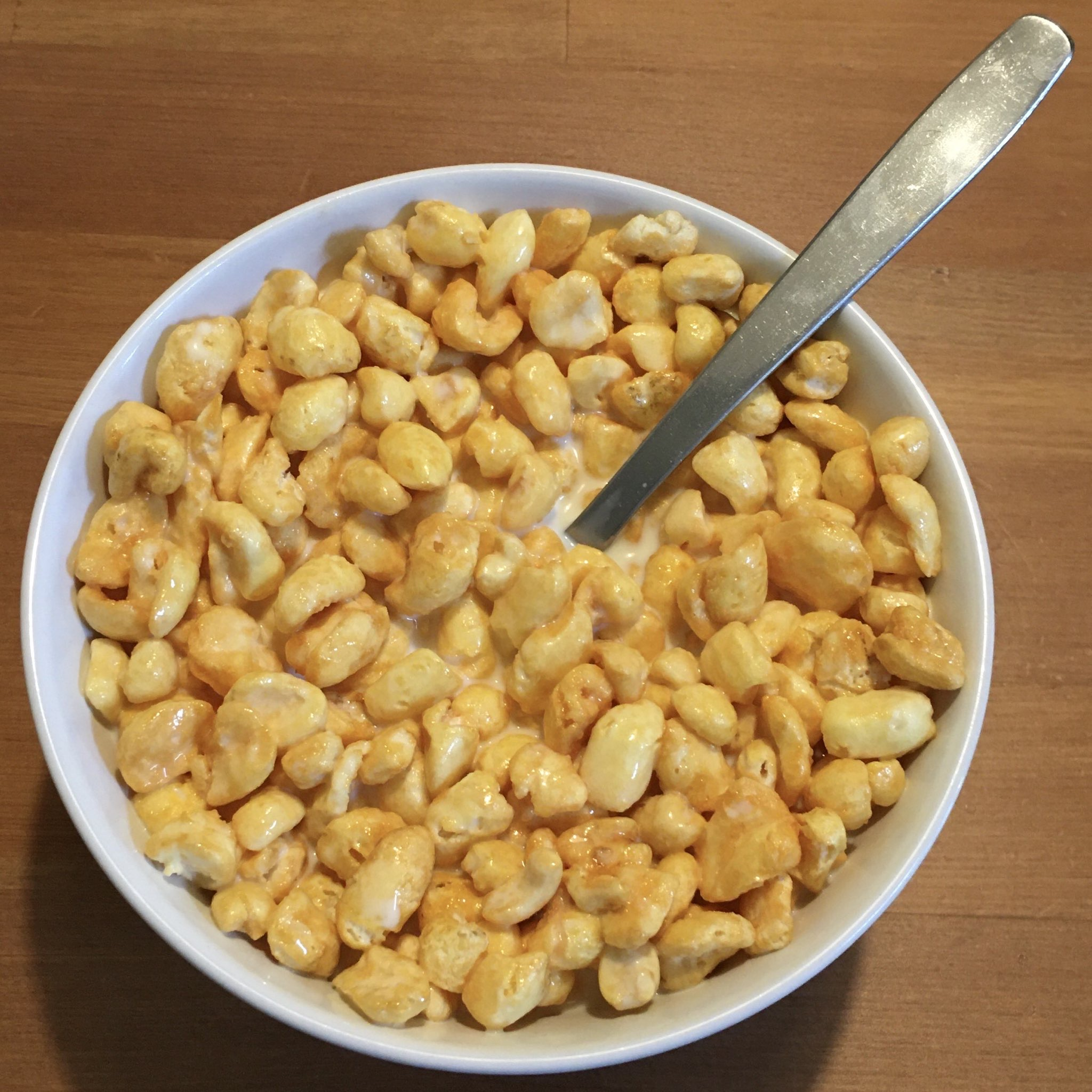
- Kellogg's Corn POPS – Sweetened Corn Cereal, with milk
- Product type: Breakfast cereal
- Current owner: WK Kellogg Co
- Country: United States
- Introduced: 1950; 76 years ago
- Previous owners: Kellogg's (1950-2023)
- Website: kelloggs.com/cornpops

Corn Pops is a puffed grain breakfast cereal made by WK Kellogg Co, described by the company as "crunchy sweetened popped-up corn cereal." The cereal was introduced in 1950 as "Corn Pops". In 1951, the name was changed to "Sugar Corn Pops" and later to "Sugar Pops". It was the sponsor for The Adventures of Wild Bill Hickok radio and television show. The name was changed back to 'Sugar Corn Pops' in 1978, and finally returned to 'Corn Pops' in 1984, a time when many cereals dropped the word "sugar" from their titles for marketing reasons. In January 2006, the name of the cereal was changed to 'Pops', but after a few months of poor reception was changed back to Corn Pops.

In mid-2007, Corn Pops launched its first line extension in many years called "Chocolate Peanut Butter Pops". In 2012, "Cinnamon Corn Pops" were introduced.

== Overview ==
Corn Pops are made from milled corn. Though the name of the cereal is 'Corn' Pops, since January 2004, its ingredients have included wheat starch, essentially making the cereal multigrain. By 2007, coconut oil was added to the US ingredients.

The American version features an irregular, flattened, smooth elliptical, shape; Canadian Corn Pops look very different; they are uniformly spherical and have a porous surface, similar to Kix. The taste and texture of the Canadian and American versions of the cereal differ considerably despite sharing the same name and manufacturer. Kellogg's says this is due to raw ingredients and the regulatory agencies that exist in a particular country, and that its cereal differs by country also by virtue of marketing and culture. Research is done in different countries to determine preferences, and the formula for the cereal is changed accordingly, affecting the texture, color, and nutrition. The fat, cholesterol, and protein content is the same.

Unlike the vast majority of breakfast cereals, Corn Pops in the USA was packaged in a foil-covered paper bag until the mid-2010s. This helped to prevent the Pops from going stale and from secreting a sticky substance that caused the corn pops to stick together (a problem caused by the method by which the cereal is processed). Honey Smacks, another Kellogg's puffed grain cereal, used the same bag Corn Pops used. However, the Canadian version of Corn Pops had long been packaged in a standard plastic cereal bag, now used for American Pops as well.

== Ingredients ==
Although the cereal contained partially hydrogenated fats, it was marketed as trans-fat free since the amount of trans fat per serving is less than the threshold 0.5 grams/serving. As of 2026, Corn Pops in the USA contain 0% trans-fat and no longer contain monoglycerides and diglycerides, which were used to bind saturated fat. Corn Pops also contain butylated hydroxytoluene (BHT), a preservative.

== Marketing ==
=== Mascots and spokespeople ===
Corn Pops used a variety of stop-motion and puppet characters for its commercials.

Guy Madison, the star of The Adventures of Wild Bill Hickok television show, appeared on the box from 1951 through 1958, occasionally replaced by sidekick Jingles played by Andy Devine. Between 1959 and 1967, the mascot was Woody Woodpecker. The next mascot for the cereal was "Sugar Pop Pete", a prairie dog dressed as a cowboy with two "six-shooters" with red and white spiral-striped barrels. Pete and the other actors in the commercial sang the jingle: "Oh, the Pops are sweeter and the taste is new. They're shot with sugar, through and through... Sugar Pops are tops!" From 1968 to 1977, the mascot was the "Whippersnapper", a live-action, whip-cracking cowboy. 1979-80 the mascot "Big Yella" was born. A cartoon cowboy in a huge yellow ten-gallon hat, yellow chaps, boots, shirt and vest who tried to trade his collection of giant yellow objects for a bowl of Corn Pops. From 1980 to 1983, a porcupine named "Poppy" represented the cereal. Poppy carried around a yellow suitcase which contained a complete breakfast setting, meeting the by-then industry-standard "part of a complete breakfast" tagline. In early 2009, a live actor dressed up as a Corn Pops puff became the new mascot of Corn Pops.

In 2007, Kellogg's introduced an alternative mascot named the "Sweet Toothasaur", consisting of the upside down bottom half of an actor's face, with a green felt cap with googly eyes and red paper horns on the actor's chin. The Sweet Toothasaur terrorized a city of stop-motion Corn Pops characters. The animation studio Screen Novelties (known for Robot Chicken) created some of these stop-motion commercials for the cereal.

== Outside the USA ==
=== Canada and France ===
Unlike the American Corn Pops, in Europe and Canada the cereal consists of small, spherical, uniform balls. Both versions are crunchier and have a different taste than the American version.

=== United Kingdom ===
In 1993, Corn Pops were introduced in the United Kingdom but by 2004, they were no longer available. The tagline used in the UK was different: "You can't stop a corn popper popping more corn." Corn Pops sponsored UK boy band Take That's 1994 tour, known as "The Pops Tour".

== Controversies ==
Corn Pops attracted attention in 2017 when author Saladin Ahmed observed that the art on the back of the Corn Pops box, which depicted a number of anthropomorphized Corn Pops playing and participating in various activities, featured just one Corn Pop which was brown colored, which was portrayed working as a janitor washing the floor. Ahmed posted his observations to Twitter, where they went viral. Kellogg's responded to Ahmed on Twitter apologizing for the artwork, and the artwork was changed for future boxes of the cereal.
