= Healthy digestion =

Absorption of nutrients in diet

Healthy digestion, also called digestive health, results in the absorption of nutrients from food without distressing symptoms. Healthy digestion follows having a healthy diet, doing appropriate self-care including physical activity and exercise, minimizing activities like smoking or consuming alcoholic drinks which impair digestion, and managing any medical condition which disrupts digestion to the best of one's ability.

A person with healthy digestion will have lower risk of experiencing diarrhea, vomiting, constipation, heartburn, bloating, flatulence, and indigestion. Additionally, a person with healthy digestion will have less need for digestive medications than a person who does not.

Some foods like bananas, avocados, melons, oats, and yogurt quickly or completely digest faster than others.

== Disruptions to healthy digestion ==
Many events can disrupt digestion. Disrupted digestion can have many symptoms, including diarrhea, constipation, heartburn, bloating, flatulence, and indigestion.

Some people have chronic medical conditions which disrupt their digestion. Other people might be taking a drug which disrupts their digestion. In those cases, the person's goals for healthy digestion might be to have their personal best possible digestion since they have other health problems to manage.

Food intolerance can disrupt digestion.

== Medical treatments ==
=== Healthy lifestyle ===
For common problems such as constipation, dietary and lifestyle measures, including adequate dietary fiber and fluid intake and regular exercise, are generally the first step before medication.

=== Drugs and other interventions ===
Various drugs can relieve the symptoms of poor digestion. Laxatives counter constipation. Loperamide counters diarrhea. Antacids counter heartburn or indigestion. Simethicone counters flatulence. Simethicone is commonly used to reduce gas-related discomfort by helping break up gas bubbles in the digestive tract.

Constipation can also be countered using enemas or suppositories, typically in more severe cases such as faecal impaction.

Probiotics have been shown to benefit gastrointestinal disorders and are a popular treatment to promote healthy digestion.

== Society and culture ==
Many people who seek healthcare for gastrointestinal problems are not satisfied with the treatment options which they find in conventional medicine. Because of this, people often use alternative medicine to promote healthy digestion.

Various organizations observe a "World Digestive Health Day" to share information about promoting healthy digestion.
