= Froot Loops =

Breakfast cereal made by WK Kellogg Co

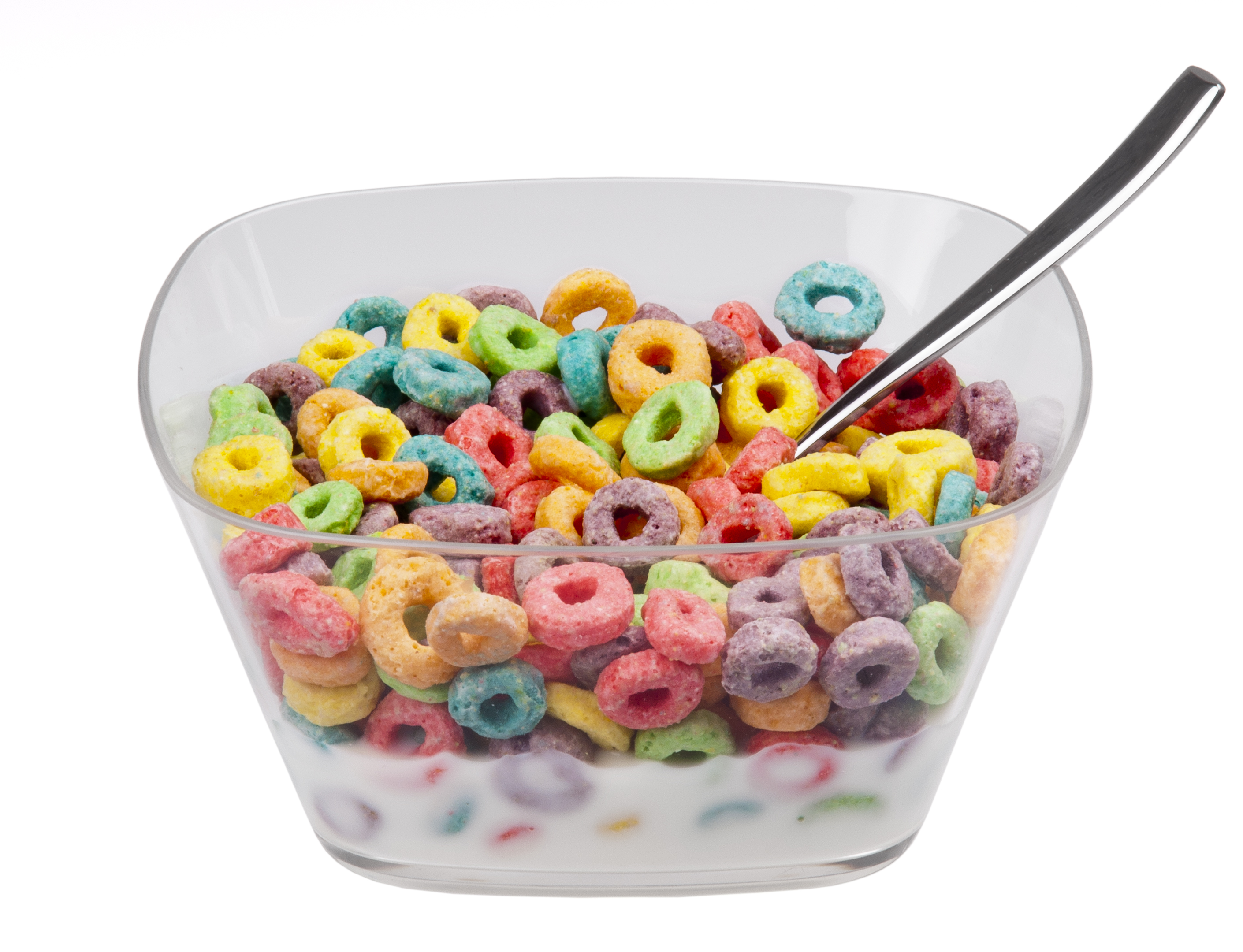
- Product type: Breakfast cereal
- Current owner: WK Kellogg Co (US, Canada, Caribbean); Kellanova (rest of world)
- Country: United States
- Introduced: 1963; 63 years ago
- Previous owners: Kellogg's (1963–2023)
- Website: frootloops.com

Froot Loops is a sweetened, fruit-flavored breakfast cereal made by WK Kellogg Co for the United States, Canadian, and Caribbean markets and Kellanova for the rest of the world. The brand was solely owned by the original Kellogg Company before it spun off its North American cereal division as WK Kellogg Co in late 2023. The fruit-flavored cereal pieces are ring-shaped, with a variety of bright colors. Although appearing in different colors, every color has the same flavor.

== History ==
Nutritional info
Nutritional value per 1 1/3 cup (39 grams)
- Energy: 627.6 kJ (150.0 kcal)
- Carbohydrates: 34 g (12%)
- Sugars: 12 g (40%)
- Dietary fiber: 2 g (10%)
- Fat: 1.5 g (3%)
- Saturated: 0.5 g (2%)
- Protein: 2 g
Vitamins and minerals
Vitamins	Quantity %DV^{†}
Folate (B9)	21% 85 μg
Vitamin D	10% 2 μg
Minerals	Quantity %DV^{†}
Iron	25% 4.5 mg
Potassium	2% 60 mg
Sodium	9% 210 mg
- Other constituents: Quantity
- Calories from fat: 42 kJ (10 kcal)
- Cholesterol: 0 mg (0%)
- Values may be different outside US market.
- ^{†}Percentages estimated using US recommendations for adults, except for potassium, which is estimated based on expert recommendation from the National Academies. Source: Kellogg's

Kellogg's introduced Froot Loops in 1963. Originally, there were only red, orange and yellow loops; green, blue and purple loops were added during the 1990s, with blue being introduced last in 1996. Different production methods are used outside the United States, replacing the artificial colors with fewer colors obtained from plant-based ingredients.

== Mascot ==
Toucan Sam has been the mascot of Froot Loops since its first appearance. Toucan Sam is an anthropomorphic blue toucan; the colors of his bill correspond to the three original Froot Loop colors. He is portrayed as having an uncanny ability to smell Froot Loops from great distances and locates a concealed bowl of the cereal while intoning "Follow my nose! It always knows! The flavor of fruit!" or "Follow my nose! For the fruity taste that shows!"

Toucan Sam was first voiced by voice actor Mel Blanc, with an American accent, and later by Maurice LaMarche, with a British accent.

Currently he is voiced by Collin Cassidy since 2021.

== Varieties ==
Kellogg's made several varieties of snack foods, including snack bags called Snack Ums. Snack Ums were similar to the cereal but larger. Their slogan was "Super-sized bites with deliciously intense natural fruit flavors" and "Flavor Bursting!" Froot Loops-branding by Kellogg's was also used with the Froot Loops cereal bar, and in 2021 Froot Loops Pop-Tarts.

In 2017, a special Unicorn Froot Loops limited edition was released in the United Kingdom.

In 2025, WK Kellogg introduced a chocolate-flavored version of the cereal called Cocoa Loops.

== See also ==
- Fruit Loops (disambiguation)
