= List of American advertising characters =

This is a list of notable nationally exposed mascots and characters created specifically for advertising purposes, listed alphabetically by the product they represent.

== Characters ==
Character	Product	Years used	Notes
Morris the Cat	9Lives cat food	1968–present	formerly voiced by John Erwin
Li'l Mo	9Lives cat food	2006, 2013, 2025-present	used intermittently over the years for different promotions as Morris' son or "mini me"; most recent series of appearances started in 2025 and is currently ongoing
The Burger Family: Papa Burger, Mama Burger, Teen Burger, Baby Burger	A&W Restaurants	1963–1974	
The Great Root Bear (Rooty)	A&W Root Beer; A&W Restaurants	debuted 1974	
The Aflac duck	Aflac insurance	2000–present	
The Ajax pixies	Ajax cleanser	1948–1950s	speaking voices are Joe Silver, Hans Conried and June Foray
The White Knight	Ajax detergent	debuted 1963	
Speedy Alka-Seltzer	Alka-Seltzer	1952–1964, 2010–present	voiced by Dick Beals
Mayhem	Allstate insurance	2010–present	actor Dean Winters
Bank Executive (aka focus group marketer)	Ally Financial	debuted 2009	Candid Camera-type setting; Tricks real unsuspecting children with offers and leaves them hurt or upset after adding rules and fees. Played by RJ Kelly.
Clip	AMC Theatres	1991–2009	figure made out of discarded movie film who appears in the 'coming attractions' and 'feature presentation' trailers seen at AMC movie theaters.
AMC Amazing Icons	AMC Theatres	2012–present	icons originally appeared in policy trailers advising audience that "it's movie time, not phone-talking time"; later appeared in the 'coming soon' and 'it's movie time!' trailers seen at AMC movie theaters as CGI-animated characters.
luggage-mauling gorilla	American Tourister	1970–1980s	
Oven Mitt	Arby's restaurants	2003–2006	voiced by Tom Arnold
Jeeves	Ask.com	1996–2006	
Lily Adams, the AT&T Store manager	AT&T	2013–present	informs customers about AT&T's sharing plans, played by Milana Vayntrub
Aunt Jemima	Aunt Jemima	1893–2020	
Bacardi & Cola	Bacardi	2003	
Dirty Sludge, Sticky Valve, Gummy Ring, & Blackie Carbon	Bardahl engine additive	1953	
Big Boy	Big Boy restaurants	1937–present	known for statues of figure outside of Big Boy restaurants, character in Adventures of the Big Boy comic book series hamburger of same name; live-action spots in the 1970s by Jonathan Winters
Dolly	Big Boy restaurants	1956–present	Big Boy's girlfriend in Adventures of the Big Boy comic book series
the grandmother in the back seat	BMW X5	2015–present	irritates her entire family with exaggerated stories while the parents are driving
the Bonny Maid	Bonny Maid floor cover products	1949–1950	played by Anne Francis
Elsie the Cow	Borden	1938–present	
Rosie the waitress	Bounty paper towels	1970–1990	played by Nancy Walker
The "A Little Better Gas Station" Crew	BP Connect Gas Stations	2007–present	plays to the song "LA" by Message of the Blues
Floyd D. Duck	Bubble Yum bubble gum		
Spuds MacKenzie	Bud Light beer	1987-1989, 2017	played by a female Bull Terrier named "Honey Tree Evil Eye"; retired due to controversy saying that he was promoting beer to children, but brought back for a special Super Bowl ad appearance in 2017
Burger Chef and Jeff	Burger Chef restaurants	1954–1996	voiced by Paul Winchell
The Burger King	Burger King restaurants	1974–1990, 2004–2011, 2016–present	
Sir Shake-A-Lot	Burger King restaurants	1976–1980	knight who craved milk shakes
The Burger Thing	Burger King restaurants	1976–1980	large hamburger puppet
The Duke of Doubt	Burger King restaurants	1976–1980	arch-nemesis of the Burger King
The Wizard of Fries	Burger King restaurants	1976–1980	robot powered by French fries
Burger King Kids Club Gang	Burger King restaurants	1990–mid-2000s	Kid Vid, a blond Caucasian male who loved video games and technology; he was the leader of the group. Boomer, a sports loving Caucasian tomboy with red hair tied into a ponytail. I.Q., a male Caucasian nerd with ginger hair and freckles who wore red glasses, a green lab coat, and a pocket protector. Jaws, a tall African-American male with an insatiable appetite. J.D., a dog and the group's mascot. Lingo, a multi-lingual, Hispanic male who liked art and carried an easel. Snaps, a blonde Caucasian female who always carried her camera. Wheels, a Caucasian paraplegic male in a wheelchair. Jazz, an Asian girl who loved music and wore a beret. (Jazz added in 2000)
Herb	Burger King restaurants	1985	played by John Merrick
Fighting chickens Spicy and TC	Burger King restaurants	2004	
Duke the Dog	Bush's baked beans	1993–present	Jay Bush's canine companion who always tries to sell his owner's secret recipe; voiced by Robert Cait
Buster Brown and his dog Tige	Buster Brown shoes	1904–present	live-action spots by Jerry Marin
The California Raisins	California Raisin Advisory Board	debuted 1987	singing, dancing California raisins
Car Fox	Carfax	debuted 2008	helps people buy used cars
The Campbell's Soup kids	Campbell's Soup	debuted 1904	
Mr. No	Capital One	2000s	played by David Spade
The Carl's Jr. Star	Carl's Jr. restaurants	1960s–present	has become Western U.S. counterpart of Hardee's
Maria	Centers for Disease Control and Prevention	2013–present	host of the cooking show Recipes for Disaster, in which she uses old family recipes but does not follow food safety properly, and her husband is aware of this as he avoids eating the cooked meals; those who do later suffer food poisoning as pointed out on screen or by the announcer.
Mr. Whipple	Charmin bathroom tissue	1965–1989	played by Dick Wilson
The Charmin Bears	Charmin bathroom tissue	2000s	
The Cheerios Kid and Sue	Cheerios	1950s, 1980s, 2012	
Cherri O'Leary	Cheerios	1940s	
Chef Boyardee	Chef Boyardee canned pastas		based on company founder Hector Boiardi
Chester Cheetah	Cheetos snacks	1986–present	voiced by Pete Stacker
Bumblebee	Chevrolet Camaro	2007–present	part of cross-promotion with the Transformers film series; also used in a television ad and sold as a level trim in the Camaro option features
The Babysitter	Chevrolet Tahoe	2014	teenager who demands more money after the mother takes her home in the family's new 2015 Chevrolet Tahoe and believes that they are worth more after she sees the features.
Hy Finn	Chevron (Standard Oil of California)	debuted 1958	voiced by Paul Ford
the Chevron Cars	Chevron (Standard Oil of California)	1995–present	
The Chick-fil-A cows	Chick-fil-A	1995–present	known for the catchphrase "Eat Mor Chikin" (sic)
Catalina, the Chicken of the Sea mermaid	Chicken of the Sea	1952–present	voiced by Darla Hood in TV commercials
Mother Nature	Chiffon Margarine	1970s–1980s	best known for catchphrase "It's Not Nice To Fool Mother Nature!" Played by Dena Dietrich; Voice-over by Mason Adams
Miss Chiquita Banana	Chiquita bananas	1944–present	
Chuck E. Cheese	Chuck E. Cheese restaurants	1977–present	voiced by Duncan Brannan until 2012 when he was replaced by Jaret Reddick (due to the revamp of Chuck E.). However Brannan's voice was still used for the Chuck E Cheese Animatronic and music video shows (in studio C), that are shown inside the restaurants until late 2012.
Blue Bird	CinéGroupe	1987–present	
Front Row Joe	Cinemark movie theaters	1988–1999, 2004–2011 2019–present	animated cat; sidekicks over the years have included Starstruck Penny (originally Popcorn Penny) and Clyde
'Citizens' of Lunenburg, Nova Scotia	Cisco Systems	2010–present	fictionalized version of the real town as visited by Canadian actor Elliot Page, a native Nova Scotian
Columbia	Columbia Pictures	1924–present	based on a representation of Columbia, a personification of the United States
Josephine the plumber	Comet cleanser	1960s–1970s	played by Jane Withers
The Slowskys	Comcast	1997–present	pair of turtles (living as a married couple in the suburbs) who favor DSL over High Speed internet; voiced by Andrew Donnelly and Rachael Harris; inspired Shaw Communications' The Snailskis in Canada.
Condom Man	Condomman.com	2003–present	
Jack and Connie	Consumer Cellular	2011–present	retired couple who travel across the country in a RV
Sarah Tucker	Cool Whip dessert topping	1960s	played by Marge Redmond
The Coppertone Girl	Coppertone sun-care products	1944–present	
Sylvester P. Smythe	Cracked magazine	1958–present	
Sailor Jack and his dog Bingo.	Cracker Jack	1918–present	
Cracker Jill	Cracker Jack	1918–present	
Dr Jerry	Crazy Eddie	1972–1989	performed by DJ Jerry Carroll
Rastus the Cook	Cream of Wheat hot cereal	1890–2020	believed to be from a photograph of Frank L. White, a Chicago chef who reportedly was paid five dollars to pose in a chef's hat and jacket
Arthur Goodwin, pharmacist	Crest toothpaste	1970s	played by Arthur O'Connell
Crows Candy Mascot	Crows	1910s–present	
Phoebe Snow	Delaware, Lackawanna and Western Railroad	c. 1903–1966?	A woman passenger wearing spotless white clothing to show that the railroad used cleaner-burning anthracite coal which would not dirty passengers' clothes.
DQ Lips	Dairy Queen restaurants	2006–2011	Voiced by Oliver Vaquer
Steven Jackson	Dell computers	2000–2003	known for quotes like "Dude, you got a Dell"; played by Benjamin Curtis
Diet Coke hunk	Diet Coke	1990s	played by Lucky Vanous
"Alternative" Rob Lowe	DirecTV	2014–present	Rob Lowe in dual roles
Hannah Davis and her talking horse	DirecTV	2015–present	model Hannah Davis pitching DirecTV on a beach accompanied by a talking horse who brags about himself ("The Horse's Mouth" as alluded by Davis)
"Alternative" NFL players	DirecTV	2015–present	part of NFL Sunday Ticket campaign, with NFL players in dual roles similar to Lowe's
The Settlers	DirecTV	2016–present	pioneering family who refuses to switch from cable
Peggy	Discover Card	2009–present	a bearded man with a foreign accent (Romanian) who works at "USA Prime Credit," a sham credit company located in an unknown frozen location who preys on its customers by trying to get information on their credit cards. Played by Romanian-American actor Tudor Petrut.
The Hopper family	Dish Network	2012–2017	Boston-area family pronounces it "Hoppa."
Ned the Banker	Ditech	2002–2006	played by Ron Michaelson; shouts the catch phrase "Lost another loan to Ditech!"; now the mascot for CashCall Mortgage
The Noid	Domino's Pizza	1980s–1990s	voiced by Pons Maar
Donny and Dottie Domino	Domino's Pizza	1992–1994	the dynamic duo, embarked on a cheesy adventure in the world of pizza. These two pepperoni pals, with their saucy personalities, decided to explore the Domino’s Pizza universe.
Dr. Cravin	Domino's Pizza	1998–1999	a Chuckimated villain.
Bad Andy	Domino's Pizza	2000–2001	a troubled monkey by The Jim Henson Company.
Doublemint Twins	Doublemint chewing gum	introduced 1960s	
The Most Interesting Man in the World	Dos Equis	2006–present	Played by Jonathan Goldsmith from 2006–2016; replaced by Augustin Legrand in 2016–present
Major, the Dreyfus lion	Dreyfus investments	debuted 1960s	
Fred the baker	Dunkin'	1981–1997	known for quote "Time to make the donuts"; played by Michael Vale
The Puttermans	Duracell batteries	1990s	
The Dutch boy	Dutch Boy Paint	1907–present	
Reddy Kilowatt	Electricity generation	1926–present	used by up to 300 investor-owned utilities world-wide from 1926, although use declined in the 1970s and few remain. Voiced by Walter Tetley in two short films.
Elmer the Bull	Elmer's Products	1940s-present	Note:originally the mate for Elsie the Cow of Borden's dairy products.
Jacko	Energizer batteries	late-1980s	known for catchphrase "Oi!"; played by Australian footballer Mark 'Jacko' Jackson
Energizer Bunny	Energizer batteries	1989–present	
Esso tiger / Exxon tiger	Esso/Exxon	debuted 1964	See ExxonMobil website
Erin Esurance	Esurance	2005–2009	animated spy
Eveready "9 lives" cat	Eveready batteries	debuted c. 1920s–1930s	
Fantanas	Fanta (US only)	2002–present	fictional spokesmodels; sings musical catchphrase "Don'cha Wanna, Wanta Fanta!" Five incarnations since its debut, latter revived in 2017 as dance ensemble with one male member.
Mr. Spleen, fast-talking executive	FedEx	1982	played by John Moschitta Jr.
Orange Bird	Florida Citrus Commission	1970s	created by Walt Disney Productions
Axelrod the dog	Flying "A" service stations	1960s	
The Ford dog	Ford auto	debuted 1952	
Ethel the cook	Frank's Red Hot Sauce	2011–present	elderly woman who uses the catchphrase "I Put That S*** on Everything!" in front of the people who taste her food after basting it with the sauce.
The FCR Band; Victorious Secrets	FreeCreditReport.com	2006–2010, 2012–present (former) 2010–present (latter)	The lead singer in the FreeCreditReport (FCR) Band was played by French-Canadian actor-singer Eric Violette. Violette's singing voice was lip-synced by another singer because of Violette's thick Francophone accent. In 2010 the group Victorious Secrets won a contest to replace the faux band in a new series of ads. In 2012 the faux band returned in a new series of ads.
Frito Bandito	Fritos	1960s	voiced by Mel Blanc
The Frito Spokesbag	Fritos	2012–present	
Frito Kid	Fritos	1952–1967	used for advertising at Disneyland
Yipes	Fruit Stripe chewing gum	1962–present	
Sammy Sands	Gadgets	1983–1991	Sammy Sands was an animatronic piano player at Gadgets, a high-scale FEC
GEICO gecko	GEICO	1999–present	voiced by Kelsey Grammer, Dave Kelly, Richard Steven Horvitz, Jake Wood, and others
GEICO Cavemen	GEICO	2004–present	played by Jeff Daniel Phillips, Ben Weber, John Lehr, and Ben Wilson
Maxwell, The GEICO pig	GEICO	2010–present	
Mike, the camel	GEICO	2010–2020	reminds people that he annoys that Wednesday is "HUMP DAY!”
The squirrels	GEICO	2008–present	congratulated themselves after running a vehicle off the road
Spy mom	GEICO	2010–present	always on her phone trying to talk to her son (she is unaware that he is a spy operative). She also is aware of the GEICO characters and wonders how they ended up in the commercial shoot during a contest sponsored by the insurer in 2018 ("No wonder they call it 'Hollyweird!’”).
Betty Crocker	General Mills	1921–present	
The Gerber baby	Gerber baby products	1927–present	sketched by Dorothy Hope Smith, depicts four-month-old neighbor Ann Turner; commercials voiced by Tex Brashear
Sharpie the Parrot	Gillette Blue Blade razors	1952–1960	
The Gold Dust Twins	Gold Dust Washing Powder	1880s–1940s	
The Quisenberrys	Golden Corral	2015	
Choo-Choo Charlie	Good & Plenty candy	1950–1970s	
Gorton's Fisherman	Gorton's of Gloucester Fish products	1964–present	
Granny Goose	Granny Goose snacks		
Jolly Green Giant	Green Giant vegetables	1928–present	originally voiced by Herschel Bernardi; then Len Carlson
Little Green Sprout	Green Giant vegetables		
The running Greyhound	Greyhound Lines	1937–present	also used a live greyhound in TV promotions.
Lefty (The Helping Hand)	Hamburger Helper	1977–present	voiced by Patrick Coyle
Harbie The Seal	Harbor Gasoline		
The Hardee's Star	Hardee's restaurants	1997–present	
Gilbert Giddyup, Speedy McGreedy	Hardee's restaurants	1970's, 1980's	
Hartford Elk	The Hartford insurance	debuted 1974	
Punchy (the Hawaiian Punch Guy), and Oaf/Opie	Hawaiian Punch	debuted 1961	
John Holiday	Holiday Inn	1950s–1980s	Mascot was Paul Revere-like character
Mr. Opportunity	Honda	2004–2011	
Strawberry Shortcake	Honda	2014	CGI doll version of the character
King Ding Dong / King Don	Hostess Brands		
Captain Cupcake	Hostess Brands		
Fruit Pie the Magician	Hostess Brands	1973–2006	
Chauncey Chocodile	Hostess Brands		
Chipper Brownie	Hostess Brands		
Chief Big Wheels	Hostess Brands		
Happy HoHo	Hostess Brands		
Suzy Q	Hostess Brands		
Captain Obvious	Hotels.com	2014–present	ad campaign created by Crispin Porter & Bogusky, portrayed by Brandon Moynihan
Happy Hotpoint	Hotpoint home appliances	debuted 1955	played by Mary Tyler Moore
Simple Simon & The Pieman	Howard Johnson's Restaurants and Motor Lodges	1930s–1970s	Created by John Alcott
The Hubba-Bubba Gum Fighter	Hubba Bubba bubble gum	debuted 1979	voiced by Don Collier
ICEE Polar Bear	ICEE frozen drinks		
Bucky Beaver	Ipana toothpaste	1957–1959	voiced by Jimmie Dodd
Joe Isuzu	Isuzu auto	1986–1990	played by David Leisure
Jack, the ping-pong-ball-headed man	Jack in the Box restaurants	1994–present	
Chinese baby	Jell-O gelatin	debuted 1959	voiced by Allen Swift
Mr. Jelly Belly	Jelly Belly jelly beans	1996–present	
Jollibee	Jollibee	1980–present	
Fruit Gang	Jolly Rancher	2015–present	
Figment	Journey into Imagination with Figment	1983-present	A small purple dragon who is the mascot of the Imagination! pavilion at the Epcot theme park at the Walt Disney World Resort.
Kedso the Clown	Keds shoes		
Kolonel Keds	Keds shoes		
Kaptain Keds and Kedzam	Keds shoes		
Ernie Keebler and the Keebler elves	Keebler snacks	1968–present	Ernie voiced by Parley Baer for many years
Milton the Toaster	Kellogg's Pop-Tarts	1970s–1980s	voiced by William Schallert
Colonel Sanders	KFC restaurants	1952–present	Colonel Harland Sanders founded Kentucky Fried Chicken and eventually became its mascot; a later cartoon version was voiced by Randy Quaid.
Foghorn Leghorn	KFC restaurants	1986–1988	One of the Looney Tunes in form of the commercials along with Henery Hawk, Egghead Jr., and Miss Prissy.
Jason Alexander	KFC restaurants	2001–2003	
Hip-Hop Hamsters	Kia Soul	2010–present	lip-synchs to Black Sheep's 1992 single "The Choice Is Yours". The Hamsters later updated their style to coincide with the Soul's added features.
The HotBot	Kia Forte	2013–present	played by Miss USA 2011 Alyssa Campanella
Morpheus	Kia Optima	2014–present	actor Laurence Fishburne reprising his character from The Matrix
K.C. Penguin	Kid Cuisine meals		
Manners the butler	Kleenex table napkins	1957–1950s	played by Richard Cutting
Kool-Aid Man	Kool-Aid drink mixes	1975–present	
Cheesasaurus Rex	Kraft Macaroni & Cheese	1991–2010	
Dairy Fairy	Kraft Singles cheese	debuted 1980s	
Buddy Lee doll	Lee Jeans	1998–present	based on the doll who debuted in 1921
Liberty Biberty	Liberty Mutual Insurance	2026	based off the parody catchphrase of the Struggling Actor character; a fuzzy yellow puppet with a Statue of Liberty crown
Limu Emu & Doug	Liberty Mutual Insurance	2019–present	cop-like insurance agents (a human male and an emu sidekick); parody on 1970s TV crime drama shows
Struggling Actor	Liberty Mutual Insurance	2019–present	actor (portrayed by Tanner Novlan) who notably mispronounces Liberty Mutual as "Liberty Biberty"; became the subject of online memes and led to the introduction of the Liberty Biberty mascot
Little Caesar	Little Caesars pizza		
Red and Yellow	M&M's candy	1960s–present	originally voiced by Don Messick and Stan Freberg, now widely popular as CG spokescandies, voiced originally by Jon Lovitz and John Goodman, and now Billy West and J. K. Simmons, respectively
Blue and Miss Green	M&M's candy	1996–present (Blue), 1997–present (Miss Green)	Blue originally voiced by Phil Hartman now Rob Pruitt; Miss Green voiced by Cree Summer
Orange	M&M's candy	1998–present	voiced by Eric Kricberger
Miss Brown	M&M's candy	2010–present	voiced by Vanessa Williams
Purple	M&M's candy	2022–present	voiced by Grace Kelly
Alfred E. Neuman	Mad magazine	1954–present	
Rocketman	Malektronic	2014–present	
Cool Blue and Li'l Oaty	Malt-O-Meal cereal	1998–present	
Matty Mattel and Sisterbelle	Mattel toys	1959–1962	
Marky Maypo	Maypo Oatmeal	1956–present	created by Storyboard, Inc. (John Hubley)
Ol' Lonely, the Maytag repairman	Maytag appliances	debuted 1967	played by Jesse White (1967–1988), Gordon Jump (1988–2003), Hardy Rawls (2003–present)
Scoopy, Gabby and TeeVee, The McClatchy Bees	The McClatchy Company	1943–present	created by Walt Disney Productions; Scoopy is the mascot for the Sacramento Bee, Modesto Bee, and Fresno Bee newspapers; Gabby was the radio mascot for McClatchy's former radio stations and TeeVee was the television mascots of now CBS O&O KOVR-TV/Sacramento and Nexstar Media Group's NBC affiliate KMJ-TV (now KSEE-TV)/Fresno.
Speedee	McDonald's restaurants	1948–1962	Original Mascot
Ronald McDonald	McDonald's restaurants	1959–present	originally played in Washington, D.C. by Willard Scott
Hamburglar	McDonald's restaurants	1971–2003	A criminal type who stole hamburgers every chance he had. Originally voiced by Howard Morris, later by Charlie Adlder and Carl W. Wolfe
Grimace	McDonald's restaurants	1971–2003	A purple character who originally stole milkshakes, part of a larger population of Grimaces
Captain Crook	McDonald's restaurants	1970–1985	
Mayor McCheese	McDonald's restaurants	1971–1985	The incompetent mayor of McDonaldland
The Professor	McDonald's restaurants	1971–1985	A scientist who served as McDonaldland's inventor and researcher
Officer Big Mac	McDonald's restaurants	1971–1985	The Chief of the Police of McDonaldland
Fry Kids	McDonald's restaurants	1972–1996	originally known as Gobblins, then they're known as Fry Guys, and finally Fry Kids as Fry Girls were added. Differently colored shaggy ball like creatures with long legs but no arms, looked like pom-pon's with eyes and legs
The Hamburger Patch	McDonald's restaurants	1973–1985	anthropomorphized hamburgers that grew on plants and were picked for consumption by Ronald McDonald and the Hamburglar
Trash Cans	McDonald's restaurants	1970s	twin garbage cans that were used to encourage people to throw garbage out in correct areas
Birdie the Early Bird	McDonald's restaurants	1980–2003	A yellow bird with pink jumpsuit and flight cap and scarf
The Happy Meal Gang	McDonald's restaurants	1984–late 2000s	hamburger, french fries, regular sized drink, McNugget Buddies ( chicken nuggets added 1989) and Happy Meal Box (added 2004)
Uncle O'Grimacey	McDonald's restaurants	1977–1990s	Grimace's green Irish Uncle who visited every St. Patrick's Day
CosMc	McDonald's restaurants	1980s–1999	An alien who sporadically appeared to trade items for McDonald's food
Bernice	McDonald's restaurants	1992–mid-1990s	A strange creature who showed up in McDonaldland occasionally
Vulture	McDonald's restaurants	1980s–1990s	An unnamed vulture who appeared in several multi-commercial segments
Sundae	McDonald's restaurants	1999–2000s	Ronald McDonald's dog
Iam Hungary	McDonald's restaurants	1998–2001	A floating, fast green fuzzball with orange arms and monstrous face
Mike the Microphone	McDonald's restaurants	1980s	A one time character who guarded door and ran studio in McDonaldland Magical Radio Station
Dr. Berlin Fries	McDonald's restaurants	2010s	A human Frenchman with English accent, obsessed with french fries
Admiral Frownie	McDonald's restaurants	2010s	A replacement character of Grimace, similar to Grimace except he is dark brown to resemble Dark Chocolate Brownie
Mac Tonight	McDonald's restaurants	1986–1997	played by Doug Jones
Little Debbie	McKee Foods	1960s–present	A character based on founder's four-year-old granddaughter.
Lani Moo	Meadow Gold Dairies of Hawaii	1949–present	name was selected in a contest sponsored by its predecessor Dairymen's Association
Poglodyte	Meadow Gold Dairies of Hawaii	1971–present	mascot for Meadow Gold Hawaii's POG drinks
Meow Mix Cat	Meow Mix cat food	1972–present	singing cat
Merrill the bull	Merrill Lynch		
Leo the Lion	Metro-Goldwyn-Mayer	1924–present	based on the Goldwyn Company mascot, 1917–24
Bibendum	Michelin Tires	1894–present	Also known as the Michelin Man
The Micro Machines Man	Micro Machines		performed by John Moschitta Jr.
The Mobil Pegasus	Mobil	1911–present	
The Morton Girl	Morton Salt	1914–present	
Willy the Hillbilly	Mountain Dew	1948–1973	
Puppy Monkey Baby	Mountain Dew	2016	
VooDEWgrim	Mountain Dew	2019–2023	a walking grim reaper skeleton with a scythe advertising the VooDEW line of mystery flavors released in the Halloween season
Mr. Clean	Mr. Clean cleaning products	1958–present	first live-action Mr. Clean played by House Peters Jr.
Mrs. Butterworth	Mrs. Butterworth's syrup		a talking syrup bottle
Mimsie the Cat	MTM Enterprises	1970–1998	
McGruff the Crime Dog	National Crime Prevention Council	1978–present	
Nabisco Thing	Nabisco	1995	
Juan Valdez	National Federation of Coffee Growers (Colombia)	1959–present	played by José F. Duval (1959–1969), Carlos Sánchez (1969–2006), Carlos Castañeda (2006–present)
Crash test dummies Vince and Larry	National Highway Traffic Safety Administration	1985–1999	voiced by Jack Burns and Lorenzo Music, respectively
NBC Peacock	NBC	1956–1975, 1979–present	first appeared in 1956, debuted as animated logo in 1957
Polar Bear	Nelvana	1978–present	
Farfel the Dog	Nestlé Quik	1953–1965	played by ventriloquist Jimmy Nelson
Quickie the NesQuik Bunny	Nestlé Quik/NesQuik	1973–present	voiced by Barry Gordon
Dusty the Dusthole	Nevada Air Quality Management Division	2003–present	known for catchphrase "Don't Be a Dusthole!"; played by Alan Burd
Eustace Tilley	The New Yorker	1925–present	First drawn by Rea Irvin
Li'l Penny	Nike athletic shoe	debuted 1996	voiced by Chris Rock, based on basketball's Penny Hardaway
Morris the Cat	9Lives cat food	1968–present	voiced by John Erwin
The Rubberband Man	OfficeMax	2004–2005	played by Eddie Steeples
Old Spice sailor	Old Spice aftershave	1970s–1980s	played by John Bennett Perry
The Man Your Man Could Smell Like	Old Spice body wash	2010–present	played by Isaiah Mustafa
Vanessa	Orbit chewing gum	2002–present	played by Vanessa Branch
The Pink Panther	Owens Corning Fiberglass Insulation		
Madge the Manicurist	Palmolive dish detergent	1966–1992	played by Jan Miner
Pampers pampa	Pampers diapers		
Patsy	Partnership for a Drug-Free America	2008	not-well-informed housewife/mother in the "Don't Be A Patsy" commercials. Played by Pam Cook
Hap-pea and Pea-Wee	Pea Soup Andersen's	debuted 1957	"non-identical twins" voiced by Bob Elliott and Ray Goulding
Manny, Moe, and Jack	Pep Boys auto parts stores		caricatures based on founders Emanuel "Manny" Rosenfeld, Maurice L. "Moe" Strauss, and W. Graham "Jack" Jackson
Pets.com Sock Puppet	Pets.com		originally performed by Michael Ian Black; now mascot for auto loan company Bar None
The Angels	Philadelphia Cream Cheese	1999–present	originated in Canada in 1994, although TV spots were produced in US; played in various ads by Linda Kash, Kelly Hu and Krista Sutton
Poppin' Fresh, the Pillsbury Doughboy	Pillsbury	1965–present	voiced first by Paul Frees, currently by JoBe Cerny
The Pine Sol Lady	Pine-Sol cleaning detergent		played by Diane Amos
Pizza Pete	Pizza Hut	1958–1970	The initial mascot never been animated.
Pizza Head	Pizza Hut	1993–1997	The title character of The Pizza Head Show commercial skits.
Mr. Peanut	Planters snacks	1916–present	
Popsicle Pete	Popsicle ice pops	1940s–1995	
Julius Pringles	Pringles	1967–present	
Flo	Progressive Insurance	2008–present	actress Stephanie Courtney
Flobot	Progressive Insurance	2012–present	robot version of Flo, who is jealous of her "replacement"
Jamie	Progressive Insurance	2008–present	"The Number 1 'Number 2' assistant"
The Progressive Insurance Box	Progressive Insurance	2013–present	talkative bragging box
Mara	Progressive Insurance	2019–present	Flo’s friend and assistant, who feels like she’s unattractive and tends to drive guys away when she talks about insurance
Alan	Progressive Insurance	2019–present	Progressive's cool and mellow employee and assistant who is always trying to keep the crew levelheaded.
Motaur	Progressive Insurance	2019–present	half-man-half motorcycle
Dr. Rick	Progressive Insurance	2020–present	parody of Dr. Phil
Qantas koala	Qantas Airlines	debuted 1967	voiced by Howard Morris and then Tex Brashear
The Quaker Oats man	Quaker Oats	1877–present	
Spongmonkey	Quiznos restaurants	2003–2004	characters originated on an internet blog
Baby Bob	Quiznos restaurants	2005–present	Baby Bob character originated on an internet blog, and had a short-lived CBS show; currently voiced by Ken Hudson Campbell
The Raid bugs	Raid insecticides	1956–present	since 1990 voiced by Tex Brashear
Nipper	RCA	1900–present	first appeared in 1898 in Francis Barraud's painting called His Master's Voice depicting his dog, Nipper listening to an cylinder phonograph
Chipper	RCA	debuted 1991	puppy version of Nipper
Happy Cows	Real California Cheese	debuted 1990s	
Robert Hall crows	Robert Hall clothing stores	1950s	
Perrôt	Rossy stores	2011–present	
Aunt Bluebelle	ScotTowels	1970s	voiced by Mae Questel
The Scrubbing Bubbles	Scrubbing Bubbles bathroom cleaner		originally voiced by Paul Winchell
Sonic the Hedgehog	Sega	1991–present	first appeared in 1990's Rad Mobile as a rearview mirror ornament; first starring role and playable appearance was in 1991's Sonic the Hedgehog
Serta Counting Sheep	Serta mattresses	2001–present	animated by Aardman Animations
Freshup Freddie	7UP soft drink	1950s	created by Walt Disney Productions
The UnDeer	7UP soft drink	early 1970s	Christmas mascot voiced by Paul Frees; 7UP issued a promotional hand puppet of the character;
Cool Spot	7UP soft drink	1987–1995	starred in self-titled video game in 1993
Fido Dido	7UP soft drink	1987–present	
The Rock-afire Explosion	Showbiz Pizza	1980–1993	
Dino the Dinosaur	Sinclair Oil Corporation	1930–1969, 1976–present	In 1932 Apatosaurus became the company trademark after a 1930 ad campaign associated dinosaurs with Mesozoic Era origins of Sinclair's Pennsylvania petroleum.
Mr. Six	Six Flags theme parks	2004–2005, 2009–present	dances to Vengaboys' "We Like to Party!"
The Slush Puppie	Slush Puppie slush beverage	1970s-present	
The Snapple Lady	Snapple	1990–1994, 1996–2008	played by Wendy Kaufman, who also worked for Snapple
Snuggle Bear	Snuggle fabric softener		designed by Kermit Love, voiced by Corinne Orr
Two Guys	Sonic Drive-In restaurants	2002–2020	played by T. J. Jagodowski and Peter Grosz
Randy the Transistor Radio	Sony	1963	used for a promotional booklet
Miles Thirst	Sprite soft drink	2004–present	
Charlie the Tuna	StarKist Tuna	debuted 1961	voiced by Herschel Bernardi and now by Tex Brashear
The Subway Shadow	Subway restaurants	2000	hand shadow voiced by Gilbert Gottfried
Jared	Subway restaurants	2000–2015	Real name Jared Fogle, based on his real-life testimonial of losing weight by eating Subway sandwiches; was dropped from the company after he was convicted of child pornography, underage trafficking and having sex with a minor.
Lorraine Collett	Sun-Maid raisins	1915–present	
The Taco Bell chihuahua	Taco Bell restaurants	1997–2000	voiced by Carlos Alazraqui and Tex Brashear; portrayed by a chihuahua named Gidget
Whiplash the Cowboy Monkey	Taco John's restaurants	2004–present	Capuchin monkey wearing a sombrero and poncho
Tampax Mother Nature	Tampax Tampons	2008–present	dresses conservatively and arrives to give women who might be reaching their period a "gift" (a red box), only to be turned down by her intended targets. Played by Catherine Lloyd Burns
Bullseye the dog	Target Stores	1999–present	White Bull Terrier dog with red circle representing a bulls-eye over its left eye; previously portrayed in live action, but is shown more often now in animation
Taster's Choice couple	Taster's Choice instant coffee	debuted 1990	played by Anthony Head and Sharon Maughan
TD	TD Bank	2000s	Replaced the Commerce Bank's "Mr. C" after the merger
Teddy Grahams	Teddy Grahams crackers	1992–2005 2017–present	The smart Morgan, the young Amy, and the more feminine Lulu. Originally on Bananas in Pyjamas.
Toilet Duck	Toilet Duck toilet cleaner	mid-1990s	animatronic, helmet wearing duck head sticking out of a small tank. Typically strolls into the bathroom saying "Quack, quaaack!"
Mr. Owl	Tootsie Roll Pops	1970–present	voiced by Paul Winchell
Mr. Turtle	Tootsie Roll Pops		
Captain Tootsie	Tootsie Rolls		
Jan	Toyota	2010–present	played by Laurel Coppock
The Muppets	Toyota Highlander	2014–present	sings "No Time For Boring"
Geoffrey the giraffe	Toys "R" Us stores	1960s–2018	animatronic Geoffrey voiced by Jim Hanks
The roaming garden gnome	Travelocity	debuted 2003	
Pegasus	TriStar Pictures	1984–present	
Trojan Man	Trojan condoms		
Twinkie the Kid	Twinkies snacks		
The Ty-D-Bol Man	Ty-D-Bol toilet cleaners		played by Mark Matheisen, Fred Miltonberg, Bob Kaliban, Larry Sprinkle
Uncle Ben	Uncle Ben's rice	1946–2020	purportedly named after a Texas rice grower
Smokey Bear	United States Forest Service	1944–present	the original was found clinging to a charred tree limb as a cub following a forest fire; voiced by Sam Elliot and Tex Brashear
Woodsy Owl	United States Forest Service	1970–present	voiced by Frank Welker
Mr. ZIP	United States Post Office Department/United States Postal Service	1960s–1970s	
The Verizon Wireless Test Man	Verizon	2004–2011	played by Paul Marcarelli; famous for the quote "Can you hear me now? Good." In 2016 Marcarelli became the new spokesman for rival Sprint and "dissed" Verizon in new ads, saying "Can You Hear THAT!"
Erik The Viking	Viking Carpets		Made by International Fiberglass
The Vlasic stork	Vlasic Pickles	debuted 1970s	
Miss Helga	Volkswagen GTI	debuted 2006	
Mickey Mouse	The Walt Disney Company	1928–present	Originally voiced by creator Walt Disney, later Jimmy MacDonald, Clarence Nash, Wayne Allwine, Bret Iwan, Tex Brashear
Jiminy Cricket	The Walt Disney Company	1940–present	Originally voiced by Cliff Edwards, later Clarence Nash, Eddie Carroll, Phil Snyder, Joe Ochman
Tinker Bell	The Walt Disney Company	1953–present	
Michigan J. Frog	The WB	1995–2005	
Bugs Bunny	Warner Bros. Entertainment	1940–present	Originally voiced by Mel Blanc, later Jeff Bergman, Greg Burson, Billy West, Joe Alaskey, Samuel Vincent, Eric Bauza
Lil' Roy	Walmart	2024-present	A fictional dog who is advertised in Walmart's toy catalog as the toy-loving grandpup of Ol' Roy, the real-life furry companion of founder Sam Walton.
Sparky	Walmart	1990-2006, 2025-present	originally an unnamed smiley face; was reintroduced in 2025 as an AI assistant on Walmart's website and app named Sparky
Wendy	Wendy's	1969–present	named after Wendy Thomas
Where's the beef? Lady	Wendy's	1984	Portrayed by actress Clara Peller

== Other notable characters and their brands ==
- Aahzie and Kazoo – Radio AAHS
- Betty Boop (1930–1992) – Paramount Pictures (former)
- Blazin' Bill – Buffalo Wild Wings
- Beaver – Buc-ee's
- Big Bo/Cuppy – Bojangles
- Blimpie Bear – Blimpie
- Brawny Lumberjack – Brawny paper towels
- Brother Dominic – Xerox
- Bobby Bun – Schlotzsky's
- Chef Marco – Marco's Pizza
- Culligan Lady – Culligan water softener
- Gamzee Makara – Faygo
- Felix the Cat (1919–1921) – DreamWorks Classics (former)
- Foster Farm Chickens – Foster Farms poultry
- Fruit of The Loom Guys – Fruit of the Loom underwear/sleepwear
- The Hasbro Boy – Hasbro
- John H. Goodwill – Goodwill Industries
- Kenner Gooney Bird – Kenner
- Kermit the Frog (1955–2004) – The Jim Henson Company
- Klondike The Polar Bear – Klondike bar
- Little Foster – Fosters Freeze restaurants
- Little Miss Sunbeam – Sunbeam bread
- Luxo Jr. – Pixar
- Melvyn and Elmo Einstein – Einstein Bros. Bagels
- Mia (Native American woman) – Land O'Lakes butter and dairy products
- The Minions – Comcast (including Illumination Entertainment and Sky)
- Mr. Bluelight – Kmart stores
- Mr. Bubble – Mr. Bubble bubble bath
- Mr. Delicious - Rax Roast Beef
- Mr. Meow – Meow Mix cat food
- Mr. Slice – Papa John's
- Mr. Potato Head and Mrs. Potato Head – Lays chips
- Mrs. Olson – Folgers coffee
- Mr. Delicious – Rax Roast Beef
- Orville Redenbacher – Orville Redenbacher's
- Oscar Mayer Bologny Kid – Oscar Mayer bologna
- Pikachu – Pokémon merchandise
- Popeye (1930–1988) – Paramount Pictures (former)
- Queenie Bee, Andy Dandytale – Druther's restaurants
- Raising Cane – Raising Cane's restaurants
- Sambo & Jolly Tiger – Sambo's restaurants
- Scrat – Blue Sky Studios
- Slappy the Dummy – Goosebumps merchandise
- Sleepy Bear – Travelodge motels
- SpongeBob SquarePants – Nickelodeon
- The Cat in the Hat – Dr. Seuss Enterprises
- Talking T-Shirt – Adidas sportswear
- Tom-Tom – Panda Express restaurants
- Tropic-Ana – Tropicana Products
- Twistee – Auntie Anne's restaurants
- Mr. Magoo – DreamWorks Classics
- W.C. Fritos – Frito-Lay Inc.
- Whataguy – Whataburger
- Woody Woodpecker, Earl the Squirrel – Universal Studios
- Zach, Zach Jr., Zuzy – Zaxby's

== See also ==
- List of Australian and New Zealand advertising characters
- List of European and British advertising characters
- List of breakfast cereal advertising characters
- List of liquor advertising characters
