= Mr. Six =

Mr. Six may refer to:

- Mr. Six (film), a 2015 Chinese film directed by Guan Hu
- Mr. Six (mascot), an advertising character for the North American theme park chain Six Flags
