= Steak Escape =

Restaurant chain based in Columbus, Ohio, United States

- Type: Private
- Industry: Restaurants
- Founded: 1982; 44 years ago
- Founder: Mark Turner
- Headquarters: Columbus, Ohio, United States
- Products: Cheesesteak
- Parent: Escape Enterprises, Ltd. (EEL)
- Website: Steak Escape

Previous logo

Steak Escape is a restaurant chain based in Columbus, Ohio, United States. Locations are typically found in food courts in shopping malls as well as airports, all serving a variety of menu items, including cheesesteaks. The company is known as the originator of the mall cheesesteak concept. The chain is owned by Columbus, Ohio-based Escape Enterprises.

== History ==
The company was founded in Columbus, Ohio in 1982. In 1983, parent company Escape Enterprises Limited was formed, and the company began franchising.

By 1997, the company revenue was US$55.8M.

In September 1998, the chain secured US$35M in franchise funding from financing Franchise Mortgage Acceptance Co. of East Brunswick, N.J.

In 2004, Steak Escape began to open co-locations with Taco John's.

In 2014, a Steak Escape store was opened in Karachi, Pakistan.

== Locations ==
As of 2015, the company operated restaurants in over 100 cities in 23 states and seven countries, including Lebanon, the UAE, and Russia.

== See also ==
- List of submarine sandwich restaurants
