= Taco Tuesday =

United States marketing strategy

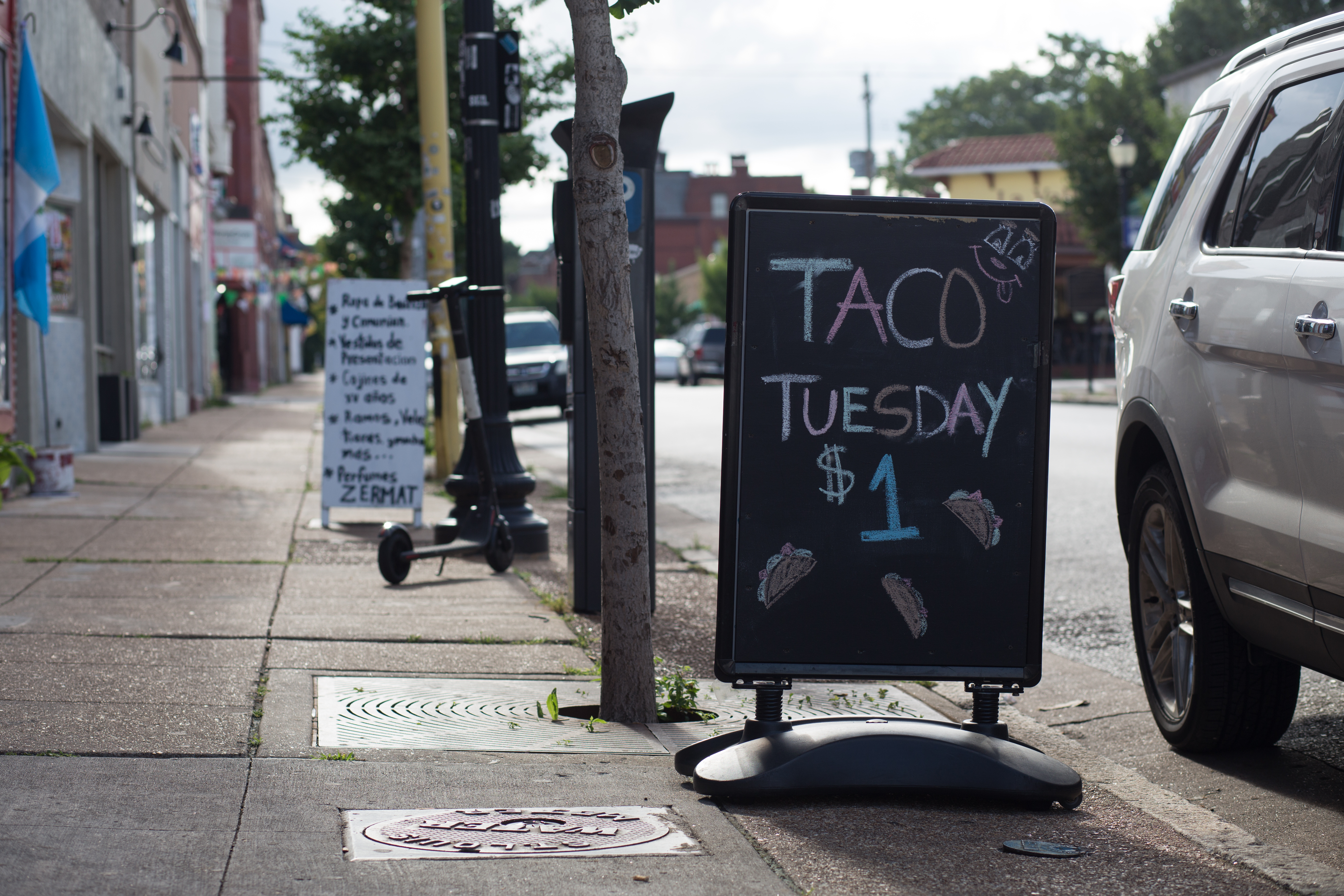
Sign for Taco Tuesday

Taco Tuesday is a marketing strategy in the United States to boost sales of tacos or Tex-Mex dishes, typically served in a tortilla, on Tuesdays. Restaurants will often offer special prices, for example, "$2 fish tacos every Tuesday night". It is popular in many big cities across the nation, and especially popular in the beach cities of Southern California.

Taco Tuesday is celebrated in other countries in the English-speaking world, such as in Canada and Australia. Similar customs are observed outside of the US. In Norway, the terms Fredagstaco and Tacofredag are used to refer to eating tacos on Friday night. In Sweden, serving tacos on Fridays is common for Fredagsmys.

== Origin ==
Businesses have advertised tacos on Tuesdays since at least 1933.

== Trademarks ==
In Australia, Salsas Fresh Mex has owned the trademark to the term since 2011. In Canada, MTY Food Group's TacoTime has owned the trademark for the term since 1997.

=== United States ===
Gregory's Restaurant & Bar of Somers Point began a Taco Tuesday promotion on February 6, 1979. In 1982, Gregory's registered the term as a trademark with the state of New Jersey. Individual franchises of Wyoming-based fast food restaurant Taco John's first started using the term in late 1979 and the early 1980s, with an Indiana franchise being the first. Taco John's was granted a federal trademark registration for "Taco Tuesday" in 1989, and defended against other restaurants using that phrase. Taco John's federal trademark rights extended throughout the United States, with the exception of New Jersey, where Gregory's retained their state trademark rights. Tortilla Flats owned a trademark for "Taco Tuesday" in California in 1984 and used it in a lawsuit in 1997.

In 2019, Los Angeles Lakers basketball player LeBron James began sharing social media posts on Instagram about his family's weekly taco dinners dubbed "Taco Tuesdays". Through shell company LBJ Trademarks LLC, he filed a trademark on the term "Taco Tuesday" for use in downloadable audio/visual works, podcasts, social media, online marketing, and entertainment services. The request was denied by the United States Patent and Trademark Office (USPTO), stating that Taco Tuesday was "a commonplace term, message or expression widely used by a variety of sources that merely conveys an ordinary, familiar, well-recognized concept or sentiment".

In practice, Taco John's was unable to stop widespread use of the term regardless. Many taco fans disagree with the idea that any one entity can "own" the term "Taco Tuesdays".

In May 2023, Taco Bell petitioned the USPTO, asking that the trademark be cancelled and arguing that the phrase "should be freely available to all who make, sell, eat and celebrate tacos". The chain also said that "nobody should have exclusive rights in a common phrase". On July 18, 2023, Taco John's CEO, Jim Creel, announced that they would abandon the "Taco Tuesday" trademark, leaving New Jersey as the last state where the phrase remained trademarked.

On October 24, 2023, it was announced that Gregory’s Restaurant and Bar, owner of the trademark in New Jersey, also relinquished the trademark, ending the term's trademarked status for the entire United States.
