= Doner Company =

American advertising agency

Doner Advertising
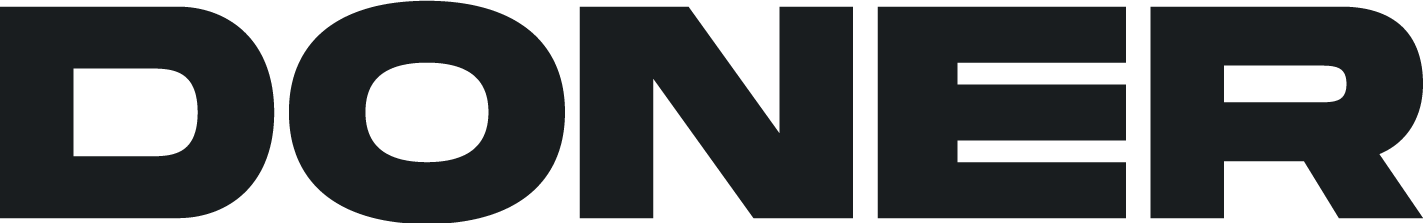
- Industry: Advertising
- Founded: 1937; 89 years ago in Baltimore, Maryland, United States
- Founder: Wilfred Doner
- Headquarters: Southfield, Michigan, United States
- Website: doner.com

Doner Company (formerly W. B. Doner & Co.) is an American advertising agency headquartered in Southfield, Michigan. It was founded in 1937 by Wilfred Doner, better known as Brod Doner. The Doner Company also has a United Kingdom-based agency called Doner London.

== History ==
The company opened in Baltimore in 1937 as W. B. Doner & Co. It was founded by Wilfred "Brod" Doner. Doner died in 1990 at the age of 75 and the company later dropped the initials from its name. The company is an independent advertising agent and has long been one of the largest. After a fire destroyed its office in Southfield in 1996, it re-emerged as an international company and expanded its reach to clients outside of the United States.

In April 2012, Doner sold a minority interest to MDC Partners.

== Campaigns ==
W. B. Doner's 1950s campaign for Timex, "Takes a licking and keeps on ticking," was ranked 40th in a list of top advertising campaigns of the 20th century by Advertising Age.

They invented Mazda's "Zoom Zoom" advertisement in 1997, but lost that account in 2010. Mazda had been about 20% of Doner's overall business.

In 2004, the company created the character Mr. Six for the regional theme park chain Six Flags. The character was used from 2004 to 2010, and was brought back in 2024.
