= Tex Brashear =

American actor

- Born: January 2, 1955 (age 71); Kerrville, Texas, United States
- Occupation: Voice actor
- Years active: 1976–present

Tex Brashear (born January 2, 1955) is an American voice actor, who after a career in radio in Texas, Arizona, and Los Angeles, made the transition into voice acting. Known as "The Man of 1000 Voices" (although he actually does more than 3000), Brashear has been heard in thousands of cartoons, radio and television commercials, and has narrated many nature and historical films. His basso profundo voice has been heard in countless movie trailers through the years. His comedic singing has even been featured on The Doctor Demento Show. He has also voiced and produced comedy bits for The Howard Stern Show and The Rush Limbaugh Program. Winner of 102 Addy Awards, he is also credited with discovering and developing the technique of reverse breathing, a vocal technique used by voice actors to help sustain their long breaths. It is somewhat related to circular breathing. In addition to voice acting, he has also served as casting director and dialect coach for many films, both American and foreign, and has contributed many research papers on the history of the American Southwest.
