= Mr. Six (mascot) =

Mascot of American Six Flags theme parks

- Six Flags character
- First appearance: 2004 Six Flags advertisements
- Created by: Doner Advertising
- Portrayed by: Danny Teeson

In-universe information
- Full name: Mr. Six

Mr. Six is an advertising character since 2004 for an advertising campaign by the American theme park chain Six Flags. Despite appearing as an elderly man wearing a tuxedo and thick-framed glasses, he is able to perform frenetic dance routines, usually to instrumental segments of the Vengaboys song "We Like to Party". The marketing spread to the parks in 2005 when one ride in the chain, Pandemonium at Six Flags New England, temporarily held the name "Mr. Six’s Pandemonium" until 2006. Mr. Six took a fourteen–year hiatus after 2010, returning on June 25, 2024 in an ad for Fright Fest.

== Origin ==
According to USA Today, Mr. Six is the creation of Doner Advertising of Southfield, Michigan. The success of the ad became such that Six Flags toured the vintage bus featured in the ad to all of its 31 parks selling old T-shirts based on the Mr. Six advertisement. Mr. Six also appeared on the nationally broadcast U.S. TV morning show Good Morning America.

The first commercial depicts Mr. Six as an apparently elderly, slow-moving man dressed in his trademark tuxedo and large glasses, driving a retro-style bus into a suburban neighborhood filled with families weary of working hard outside. Mr. Six slowly shuffles off the bus, then suddenly becomes more limber and performs a high-energy dance routine as "We Like to Party" begins playing. The suburban families happily board the bus and are driven to Six Flags, where Mr. Six dances around park guests and joins them on various attractions, then leads a parade of guests and costumed characters. He was initially a non-speaking character. Ads later showed different variations of Mr. Six dancing and inviting people to Six Flags.

Six Flags did not disclose the identity of the actor playing Mr. Six for some time, but it was eventually revealed that it was choreographer Danny Teeson. Teeson said in 2018, "The first few years, I had a hefty NDA with my contract."

== Mr. Six impersonators ==
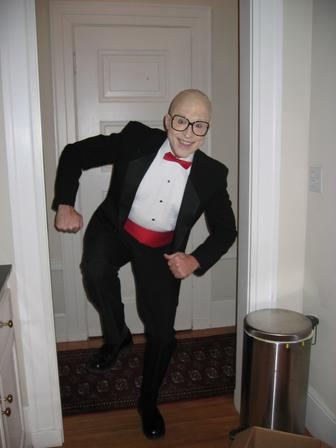
A Halloween costume based on the likeness of Mr. Six

On July 9, 2004, Six Flags Great America held a contest to find the best person who could impersonate the new "Ambassador of Fun" Mr. Six and dance like him. The reward was $2,500 cash and other small prizes. About 200 people who wore tuxedos and red bow ties, went out onto the stage and danced. Jordan Pope, 13, won the contest. Jim Crowley, Six Flags Great America marketing director, said, "Jordan truly embodies the spirit of Six Flags!... He had Mr. Six's unique dance moves down to a science, the crowd went wild when he took the stage!"

== Hiatus and return ==
On November 29, 2005, Daniel Snyder, then the owner of the NFL's Washington Redskins (now the Washington Commanders), took over Six Flags and the next day, he announced the retirement of the ad campaign. Snyder said that Mr. Six was "pointless". Mr. Six and the "It's Playtime!" motto were dropped and Six Flags' next ad campaign was "Friendly, Clean, Fast, Safe, Service." (The mascot was still prominently featured at Six Flags theme parks on merchandise until his revival in 2009.) The Mr. Six campaign was replaced by the "More Flags, More Fun" campaign, which introduced an unnamed Asian character shouting the tagline at viewers.

On February 2, 2009, Mr. Six began appearing in place of the unnamed Asian character in the "More Flags, More Fun" ads on the Six Flags website. In March 2009, Six Flags announced the return of Mr. Six to promote their 2009 season opening in numerous press releases. Mr. Six also resumed appearances in a number of new television commercials where he dances and says the "More Flags, More Fun" tagline, alongside his sidekick Little Six, a much younger version of himself.

Mr. Six appeared as a bobblehead in the Six Flags New for 2017 announcement video.

Throughout the first half of 2024, Six Flags began teasing the return of Mr. Six. On March 21, several of Six Flags' social media accounts posted a video featuring "We Like to Party" playing in the background on speakers. On June 21, the Six Flags Instagram account posted a video featuring a Halloween remix of "We Like to Party", depicting the Six Flags bus opening with fog coming out of the back. On June 25, Six Flags released a Fright Fest ad featuring Mr. Six getting hit by the Six Flags bus, marking his first appearance since 2010.

== Parodies ==
- A 2004 episode of The Late Show with David Letterman featured a parody with show announcer Alan Kalter driving the Six Flags bus and "accidentally" running over Mr. Six.
- Mr. Six is also parodied in the Robot Chicken episode "Celebrity Rocket". In a sketch, Mr. Six appears at the site of a car accident and whisks all involved to Six Flags (including a woman, a man, a cop, and a corpse in a body bag). At one point, he dances behind the woman in a very provocative manner, causing the cop to yank him away from her. At the end, Mr. Six begins driving them away from Six Flags only to cause another fatal accident. As the bus passengers look on at the horrifying results, Mr. Six begins dancing again. The cop gets annoyed and shoots him in the head.
- Mr. Six was parodied twice on Saturday Night Live.
  - He was parodied on the February 23, 2008 episode hosted by Tina Fey. In the sketch, NBC has over-scheduled The Apprentice and dozens of spinoffs have been created, including one in which the contestants are TV commercial characters. Donald Trump (played by Darrell Hammond) asks Mr. Six (played by Amy Poehler) if he would dance for him. Mr. Six says he would rather not, but the skit ends with Mr. Six next to Trump dancing to "We Like to Party".
  - On the April 16, 2022 episode, host Lizzo brings a date (played by Mikey Day) home, only for it to be revealed that her grandfather (played by Sarah Sherman), with whom she lives, is Mr. Six, referred to throughout the sketch as "The Six Flags Guy". Further, it is revealed that her grandmother (Ego Nwodim) and their poker club (Aristotle Athari, Kate McKinnon, Kyle Mooney) are all also "Six Flags Guys". The sketch ends with everyone doing the Mr. Six dance to "We Like to Party".
- Art Wander portrayed "Mr. Empire," a direct parody of Mr. Six, in an advertisement for Empire Sports Network. The original Mr. Six ads were in heavy rotation at the time to promote Six Flags Darien Lake in Empire's coverage area.

== See also ==
- List of American advertising characters
