= Taco John's =

American fast-food chain

Taco John's International, Inc.
- Logo of Taco John's used since 2021

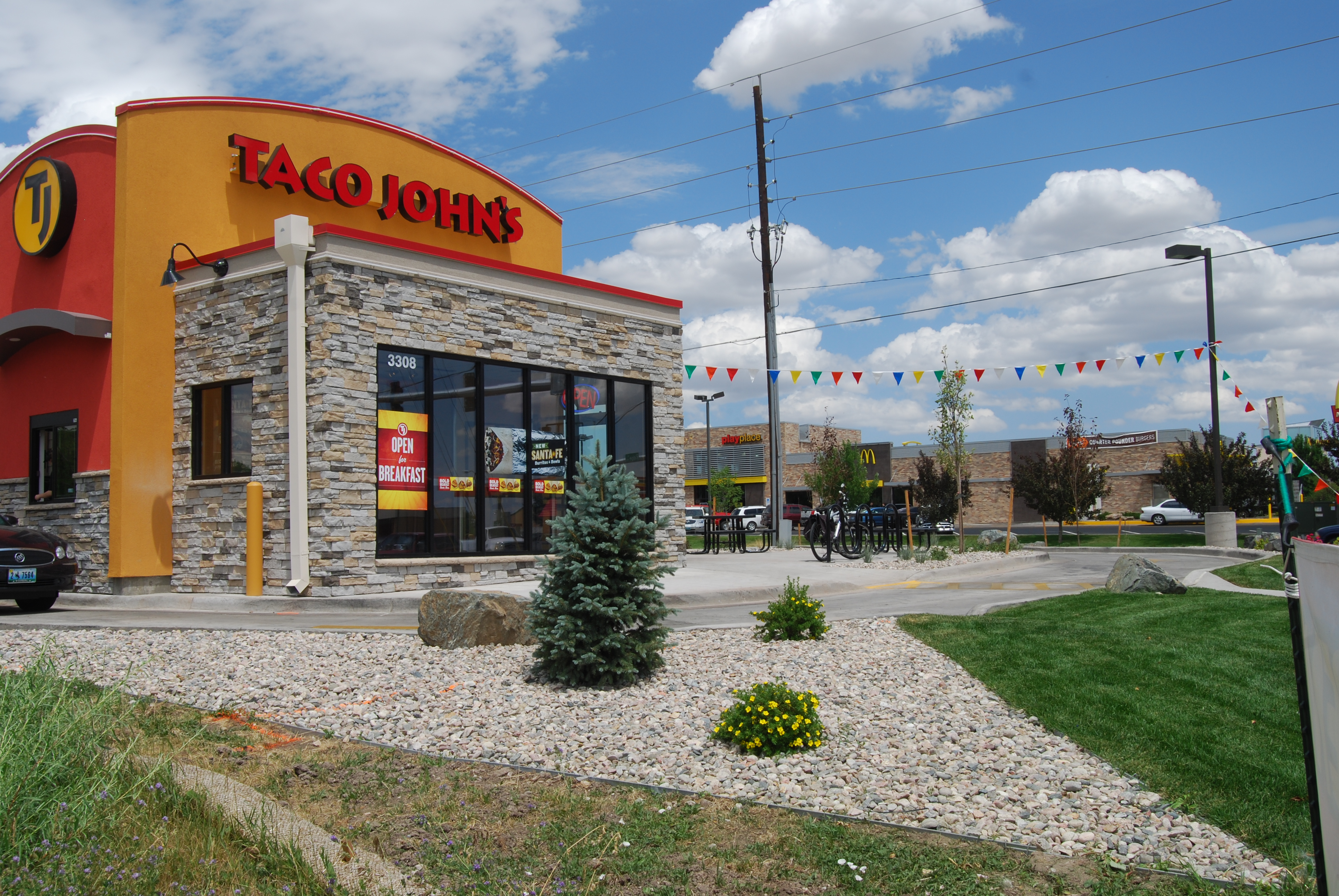
- Taco John's restaurant in Cheyenne, Wyoming, in July 2013
- Trade name: Taco John's
- Type: Private
- Industry: Restaurants
- Genre: Fast food
- Founded: March 14, 1969; 57 years ago in Cheyenne, Wyoming
- Founders: Jim Woodson and Harold Holmes
- Headquarters: St. Louis Park, Minnesota
- Number of locations: ▲379 as of December 29, 2021
- Area served: Midwest; Mid-South; Mountain West
- Key people: Heather Neary (CEO); Richard Bundy (CFO)
- Products: Tacos; Mission burritos; Mexican style cuisine; Salads; Coffee
- Revenue: ▲US$106.8 million (2021)
- Owners: Carolyn O'Connor and Bart Taylor
- Number of employees: 8,000 (2019)
- Website: tacojohns.com

Taco John's International, Inc. is an American fast food restaurant. The chain serves Mexican-inspired fast food as well as the company's signature dish, Potato Olés, which are bite-sized deep-fried potato nuggets coated with a proprietary blend of seasonings. Since 2025, the company has been headquartered in St. Louis Park, Minnesota.

As of 2022, the restaurant chain had 380 restaurants in about 22 states, primarily in the Midwest and Mountain regions.

== History ==
=== Early days ===
Taco John's started in 1968 as a trailer called Taco House, run by John Turner.

Turner was an officer in the United States Air Force who served during the Korean War and was an aspiring entrepreneur; he was stationed at FE Warren AFB. Initially, Turner wanted to find a physical location for a taco stand. He went to James Woodson to find a location to lease, and Woodson redirected him to Harold W. Holmes, who converted one of his campers into a 12x30 trailer in seven days. This was popular at Cheyenne Frontier Days. By the end of the year, the first official taco stand opened on the corner of Carey Ave and W 24th St (not to be confused with the first brick-and-mortar location a block away), continuing under the Taco House brand.

=== Name change, franchising, and growth ===
Turner began the shift to a franchise in 1969 by selling the franchise rights to Woodson and Holmes, who changed the name to Taco John's in honor of Turner and opened a franchise store under the Taco John's banner. They also launched Woodson-Holmes Enterprises, which gave Woodson the restaurant franchise rights, and the company name became Taco John's International, Inc. The new franchise location featured Taco John's original mascot, a devil, and displayed the tagline "the hottest spot in town". More locations opened in 1969, including the Loveland, Colorado, location on Lincoln Avenue.

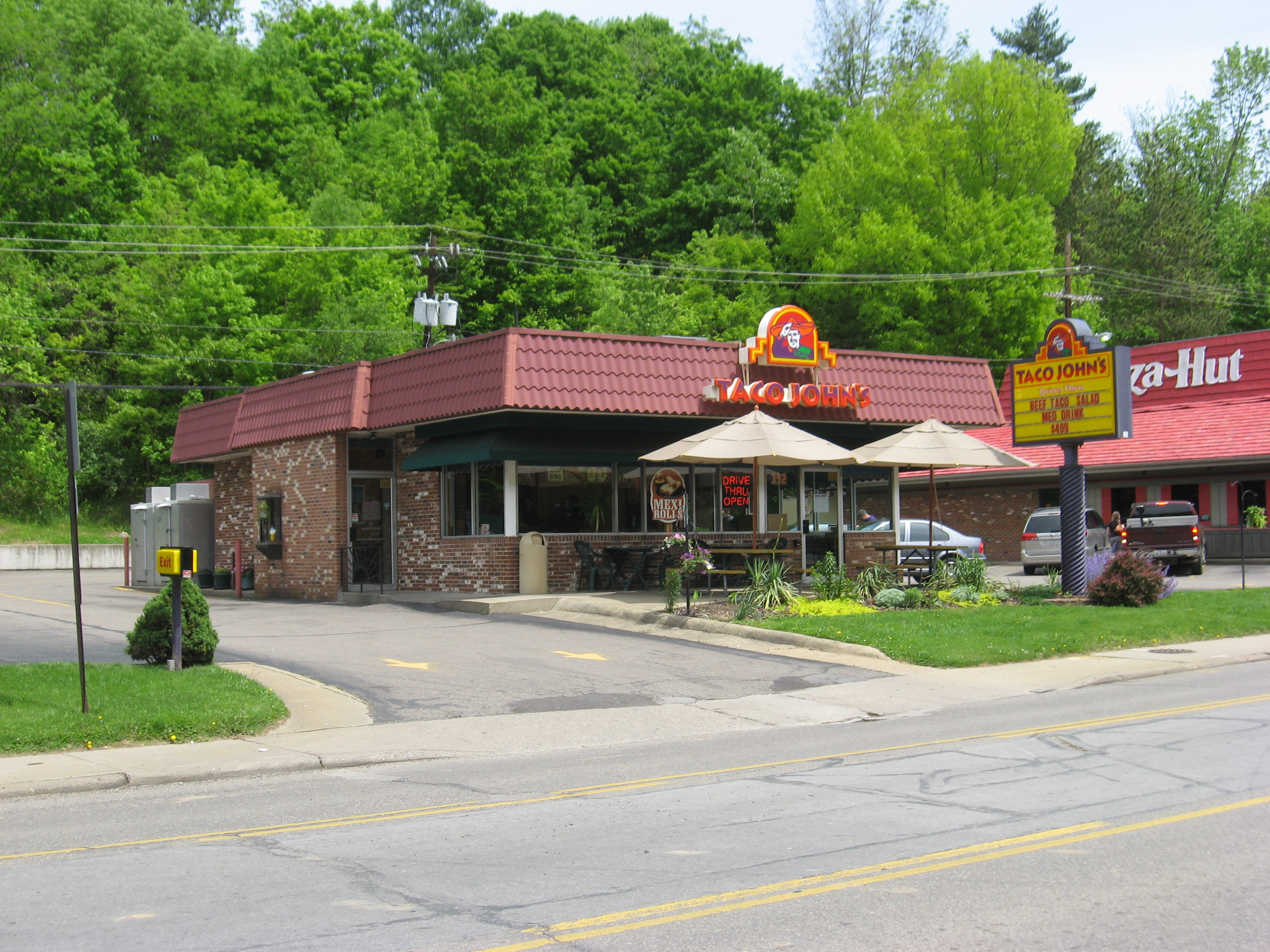
Taco John's freestanding unit in Athens, Ohio, with Pizza Hut

This led to more growth of the brand in the 1970s, with many new locations opening, including the 100th store in Scottsbluff, Nebraska, in 1975. In 1973, the first physical brick-and-mortar, in-the-ground Taco John's was built at Carey Ave and W 23rd St in Cheyenne, Wyoming, including a drive-through. The original Taco John's building was moved to S Greeley Hwy and I-80, where it was demolished, but there is still a Taco John's at that location today.

Due to large growth, Taco John's upgraded its Cheyenne headquarters in 1985. The Iowa-based franchise was the first to gain over $1 million in sales in 1994.

=== Brand partnerships with some challenges ===
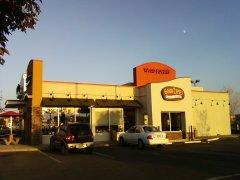
Good Times/Taco John's combination restaurant in Commerce City, Colorado, replaced and now demolished for a Starbucks.

By 2004, Taco John's began a new form of expansion normally seen in larger brands, involving partnerships with other restaurants, including local brands like Good Times Burgers & Frozen Custard and Steak Escape in 2004 and an Arby's in Lindenhurst, New York, that opened in 2015.

While some of these combo stores still exist, including the Taco John's/Steak Escape Combo at Logan St and E 58th Ave in Denver, many have either embarked on a solo journey as the Cheyenne Taco John's did after Good Times disappeared around 2010, or even completely shuttered, as in Commerce City.

Around the same time that some of these combo restaurants were closing, the original franchise owners were reaching their final days. Woodson died at age 87 in 2008 in Scottsdale, Arizona. Holmes died in 2012 of heart complications at age 92 in a hospital in Phoenix, Arizona.

=== Subsequent booms and challenges ===
Although Taco John's targeted smaller Midwestern and Western communities in its early years, the chain also began expanding its presence in larger metropolitan areas like Denver and Kansas City, where it had a minor presence since the 1980s. Taco John's also operates several outlets serving the U.S. Armed Forces through the Army and Air Force Exchange Service (AAFES).

While some Taco John's have closed, others have opened, and new experiments have arisen. For example, in 2016, Taco John's saw its first Love's Travel Stop location open in Liberal, Kansas. This was not the first instance of a Travel Stop combo, with one of the more recent Taco John's opening in the Loves Travel Center of Berthoud in 2018.

In April 2016, the company announced a deal to open 40 new stores in New York and Tennessee. The deal includes 20 stores in the New York City area and the Northeast with an option for 15 more. As of October 2016, the company had 390 restaurants spread throughout Wyoming and 24 other states. As of August 2021, there is only one New York location, in JFK airport.

In 2017, Taco John's opened 10 new locations and expanded to Tennessee and Indiana. In 2019, it planned to open new locations in central Kentucky, Georgia, South Carolina and North Carolina.

As of August 2021, there are 380 locations, with more planned.

In 2022, Taco John's filed suit against a small Minnesota restaurant chain, Taco Chon, which it accused of stealing its image and likeness.

=== Building prototypes ===
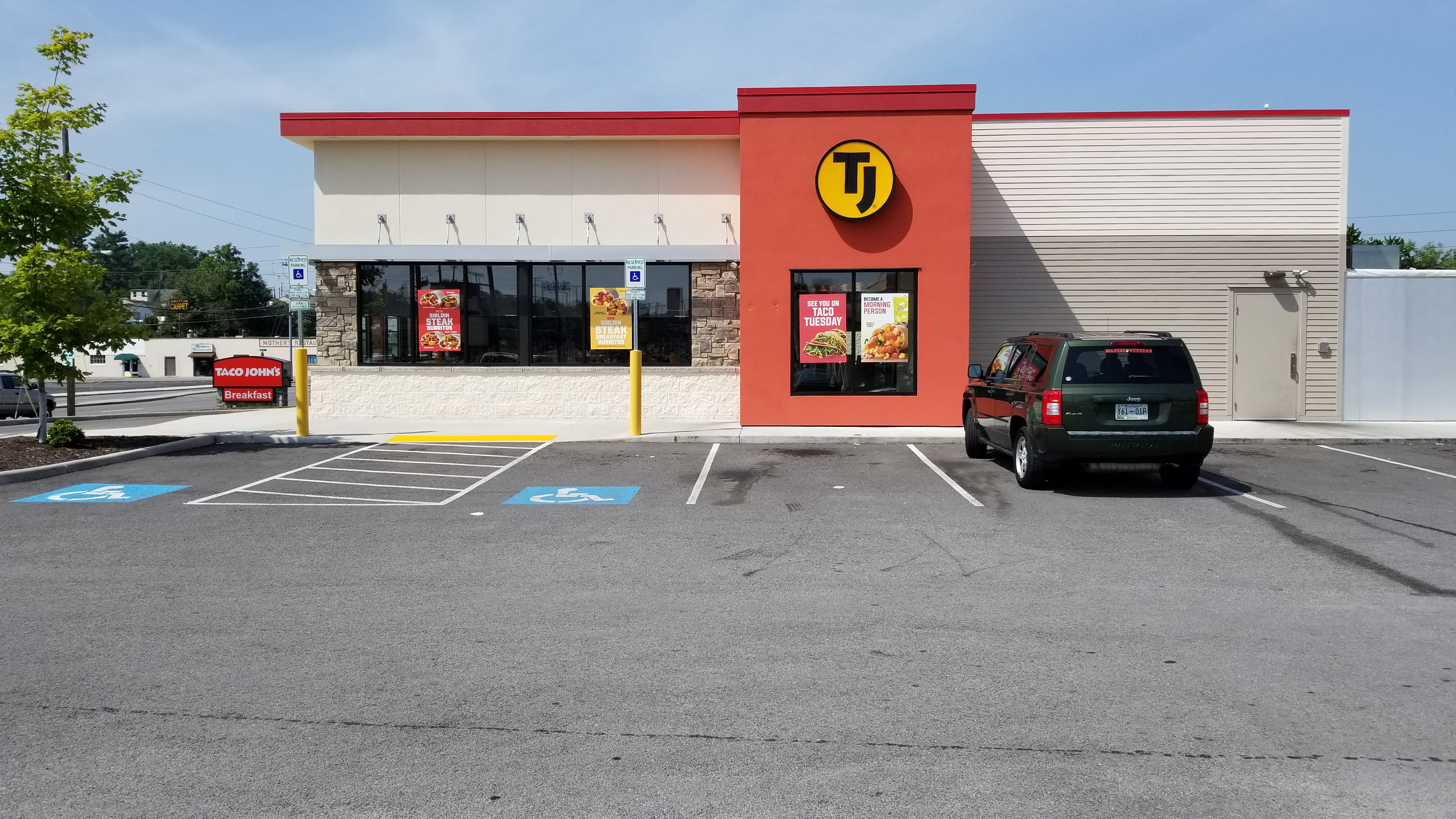
A Taco John's in Bristol, Virginia, using the 2010s-style of façade and signage. This location is now closed.

Taco John's has had many different styles over the years. Their most recent one is best reflected by the Cheyenne restaurant, the first location to use this specific style, rebuilt in 2019.

== Trademarks ==
Taco John's has adopted and trademarked the term "West-Mex" to describe their food and service attitude. The company defines "West-Mex" food as having fresh, bold flavors, including their signature "Potato Olés", sauces, spices, and salsas.

In 1989, the company trademarked the phrase "Taco Tuesday" in every U.S. state except New Jersey, where another restaurant had already trademarked it. As of 2023, Taco John's had abandoned its trademark on the phrase.

== Advertising, mascots, slogans, and logos ==
=== Mascots ===
Taco John's early mascot, depicted on their street signage above the words "The Hottest Spot In Town," was a devil character. Later mascots were versions of a cartoonish Mexican character named Juan with a giant sombrero and a donkey named Pépé. That figure was replaced in the mid-1990s by a more modern, artistic image.

Taco John's recent advertising icons have included Whiplash the Cowboy Monkey, a popular rodeo attraction and PRCA Entertainer of the Year, who rides on his dog Ben to the rescue of hungry taco lovers.

Punk band In Defence performed their song "Call More Dudes" in a Taco John's as part of a tribute to the franchise.

In the 1990s, Taco John's slogan was "A Whole Lotta Mexican," which accompanied a jingle that stated "Once we getcha, then we gotcha.... gotcha coming back for more! Taco John's."

== Criticisms and controversies ==
=== 2006 E. coli outbreak ===
In December 2006, a reported 50 people became sick and 18 people were hospitalized after eating at a Taco John's restaurant in Iowa. Shortly after that, Minnesota health officials reported that an additional 27 people became ill after eating at Taco John's restaurants in Rio Grande City, Texas, and Grand Forks, North Dakota. On December 14, Black Hawk County, Iowa health officials stated that lettuce tainted with E. coli had been discovered in the supply chain. That same day, a Cedar Falls couple filed a lawsuit against Taco John's after their 9-year-old daughter was hospitalized for symptoms of E. coli. Taco John's dropped its produce supplier, Bix Produce of Grand Forks, North Dakota, as a result of the outbreaks. After a thorough investigation by the Minnesota Department of Health and the FDA, Bix Produce was cleared of any wrongdoing in the matter. The source of the outbreak was traced back to the growing fields in California. This incident came about at the same time as an unrelated E. coli outbreak at Taco Bell restaurants in the midwestern United States.

=== 2014 nametag incident ===
In June 2014, Tyler Brandt, a 16-year-old employee at a Taco John's in Yankton, South Dakota, quit his job due to his supervisor's alleged use of homophobic slurs. Brandt said his supervisor pressured him to wear a nametag that identified him as "Gaytard", and used that term to address him in front of customers and other employees. According to the Yankton store's general manager, Brandt chose the nickname for himself, and wasn't forced to wear the nametag.

In September 2014, the ACLU assisted Brandt in filing a federal discrimination charge with the Equal Employment Opportunity Commission, alleging that Taco John's violated the South Dakota Human Rights Act. Taco John's addressed the incident on its Facebook page, writing that it shares the belief that discrimination is wrong, but clarifying that the franchisor does not control its franchisees' day-to-day operations or personnel decisions.

=== 2023 Taco Bell lawsuit over "Taco Tuesday" trademark ===
Taco John's obtained a trademark for the phrase "Taco Tuesday" in 1989. On May 16, 2023, Taco Bell filed a petition with the United States Patent and Trademark Office to cancel the trademark, claiming "Taco Tuesday" was a commonplace saying and legally unavailable for trademark. Taco Bell did not seek any damages from Taco John's.

Taco John's CEO Jim Creel responded, "I'd like to thank our worthy competitors at Taco Bell for reminding everyone that Taco Tuesday is best celebrated at Taco John's."

In July 2023, Taco John's abandoned its trademark for the phrase, making it available for anyone to use. Creel said, "Paying millions of dollars to lawyers to defend our mark just doesn't feel like the right thing to do."

== Gallery ==
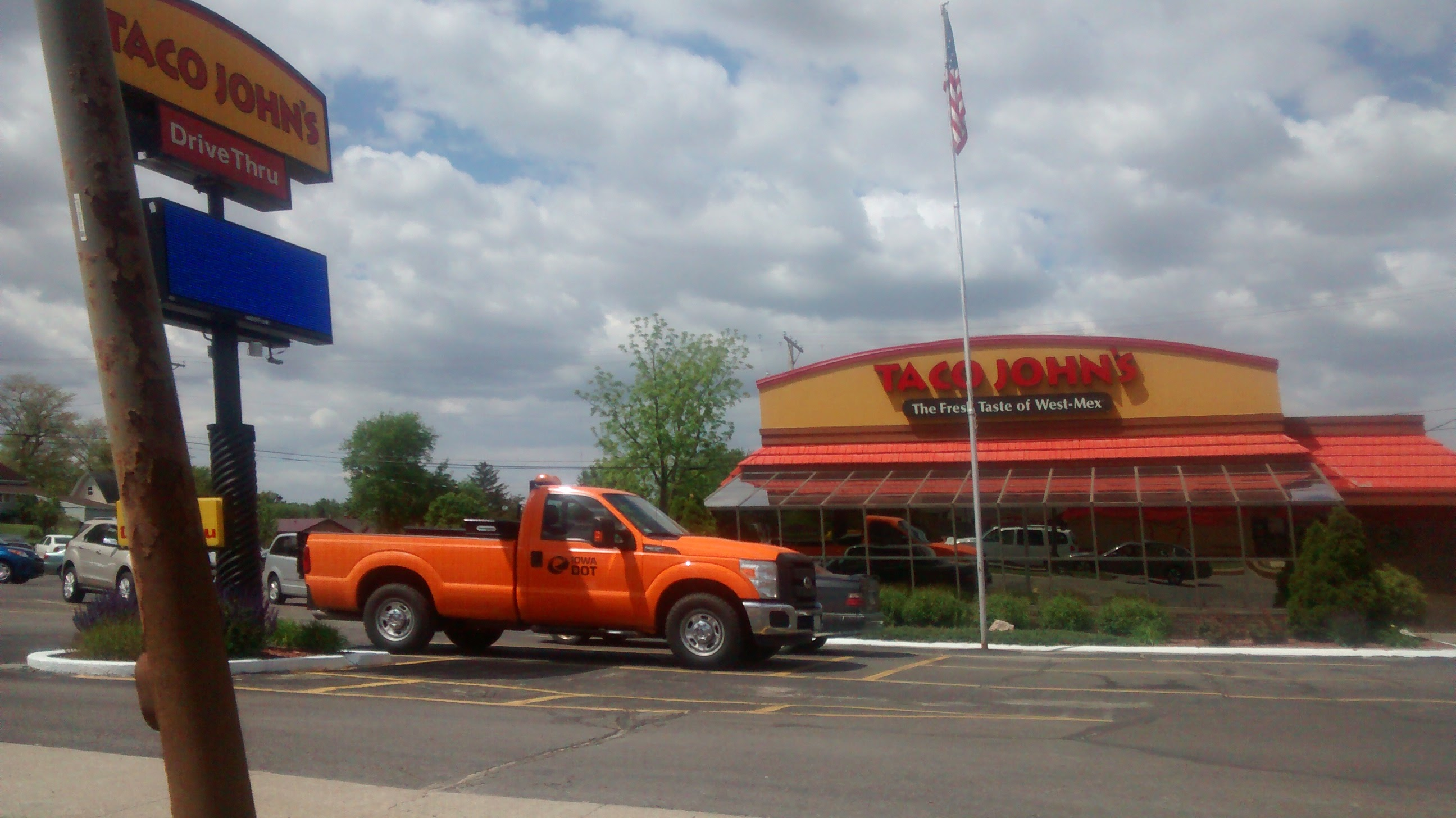
A TJ's with a solarium, Marshalltown, Iowa

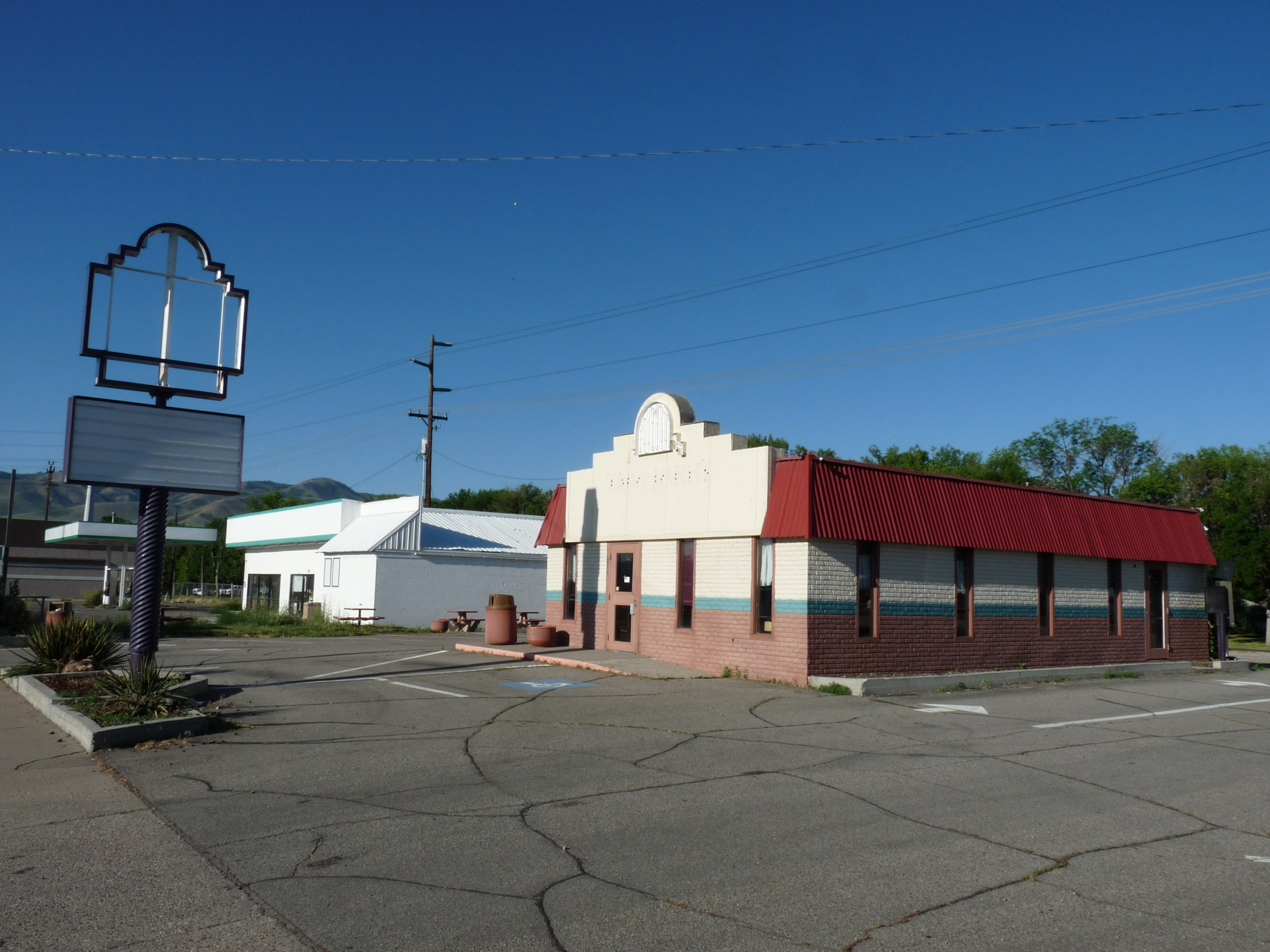
Abandoned Retro Taco John's, Signage taken down (Pocatello, Idaho)

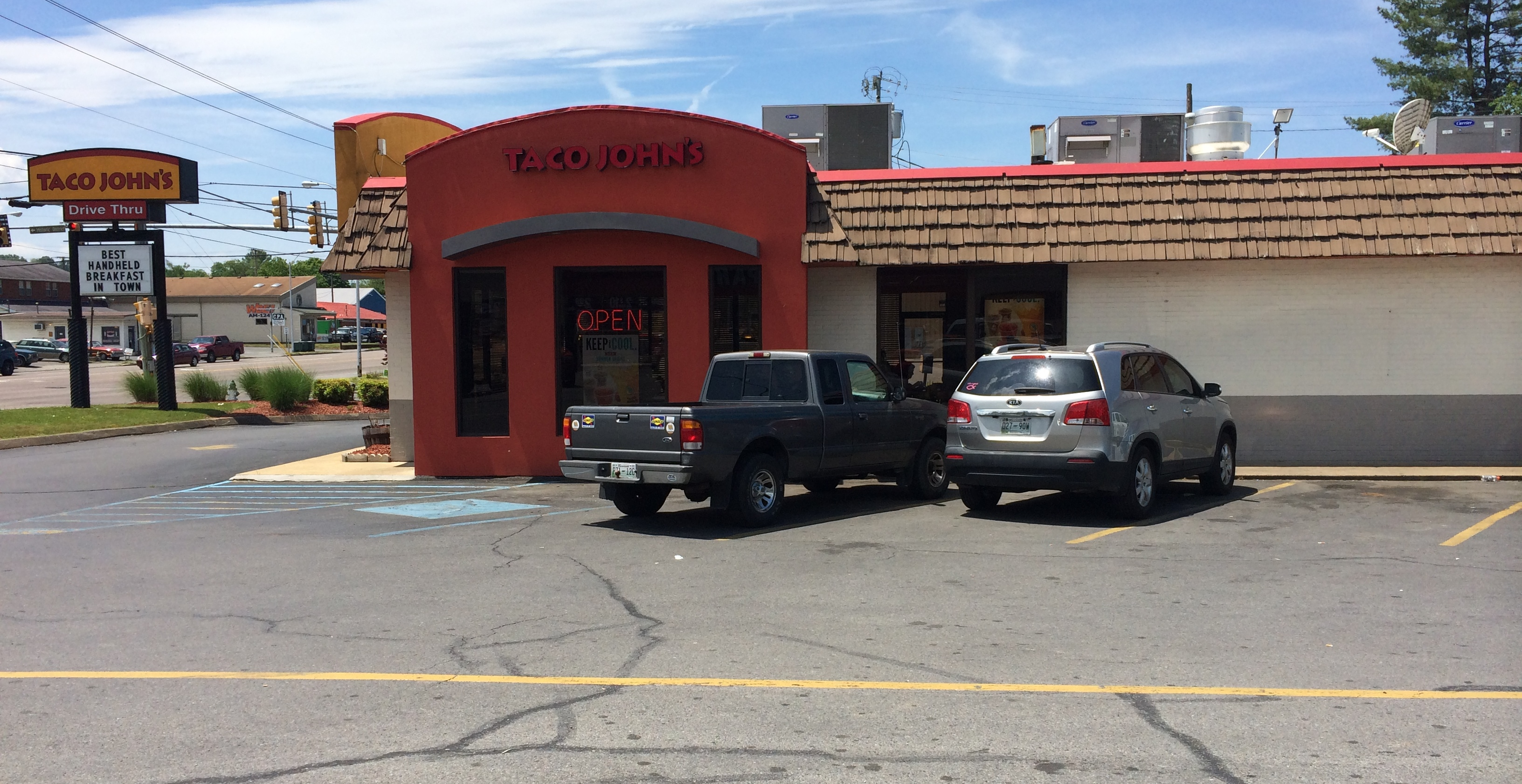
TJ's featuring 1970s/1980s style slanted roof with shingles and 2000s-style facade/signage (Elizabethton, Tennessee)

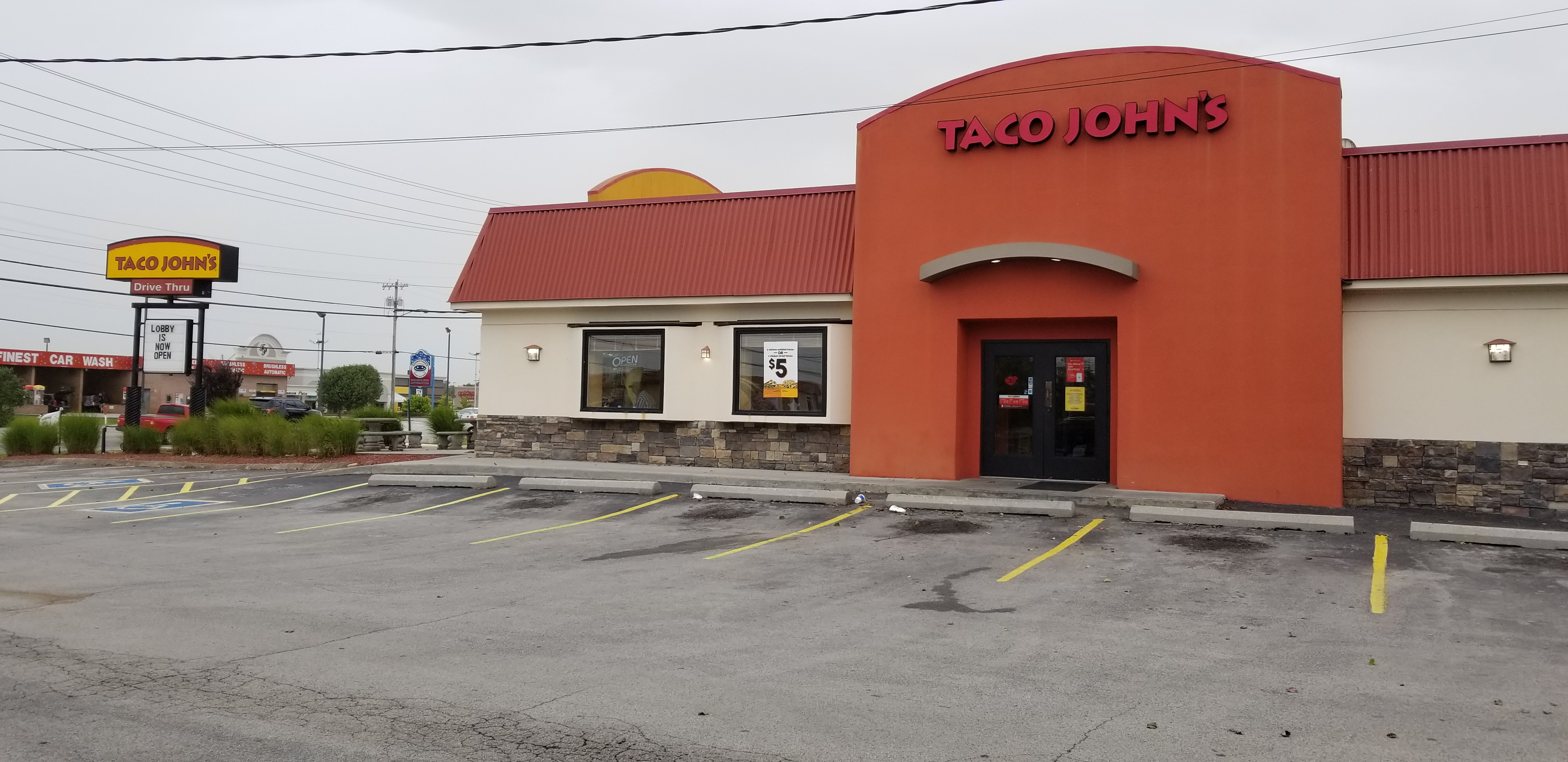
TJ's featuring a slightly updated slant-roof facade, Located in Morristown, Tennessee

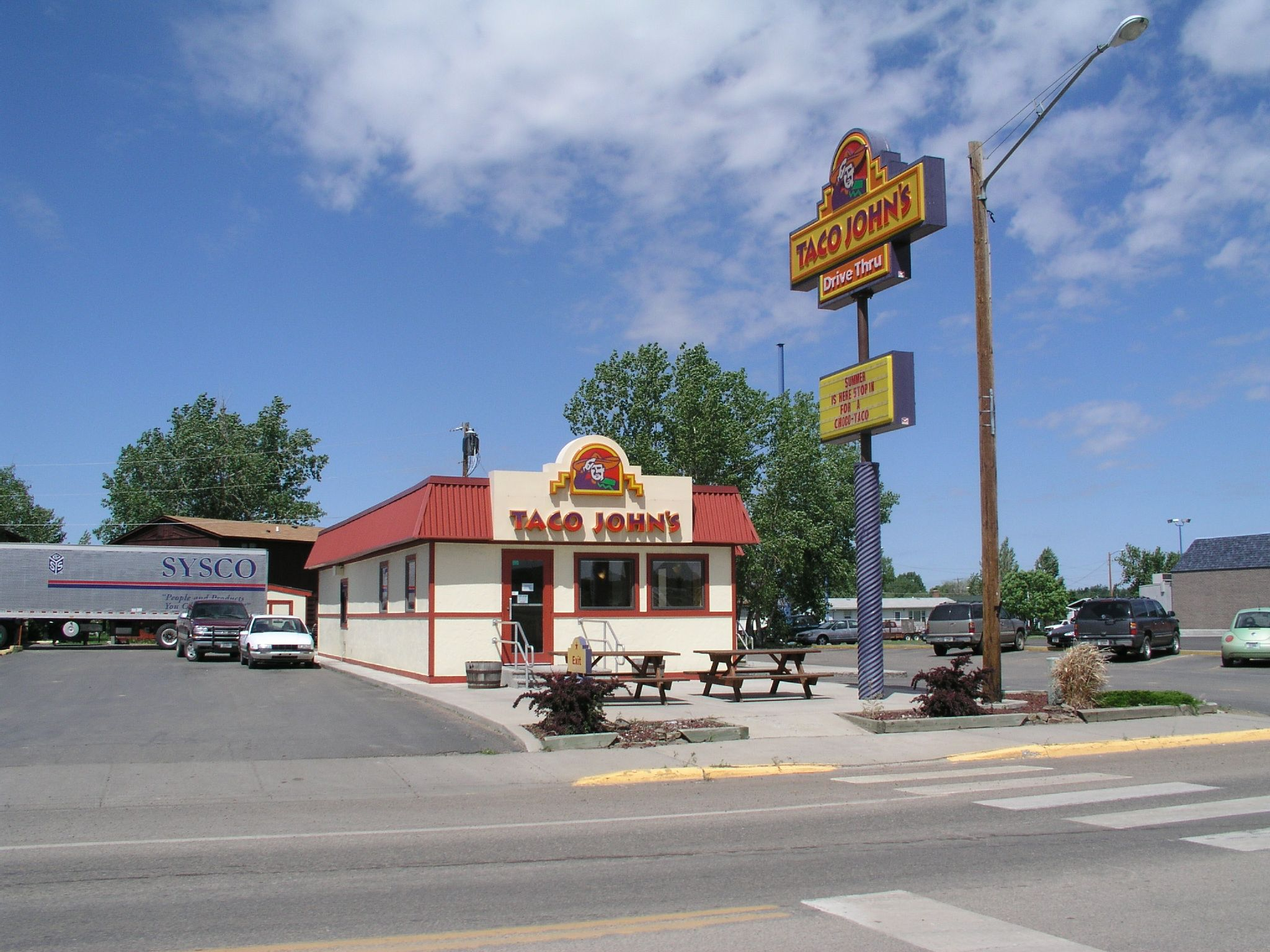
TJ's featuring old school signage on an old school building in Miles City, Montana (Since been updated in Facade and Signage)

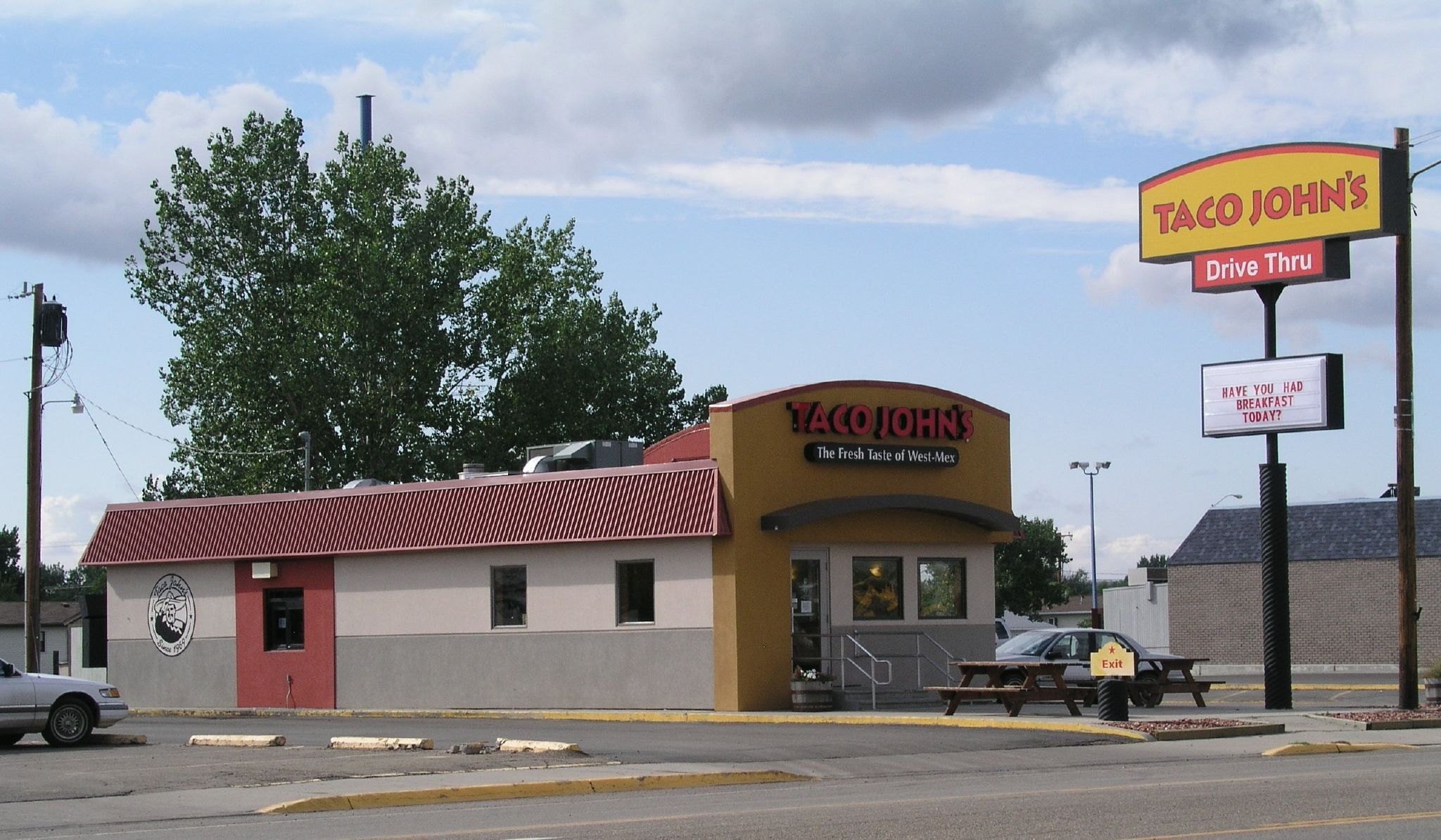
A very oblong TJ's in Miles City, Montana

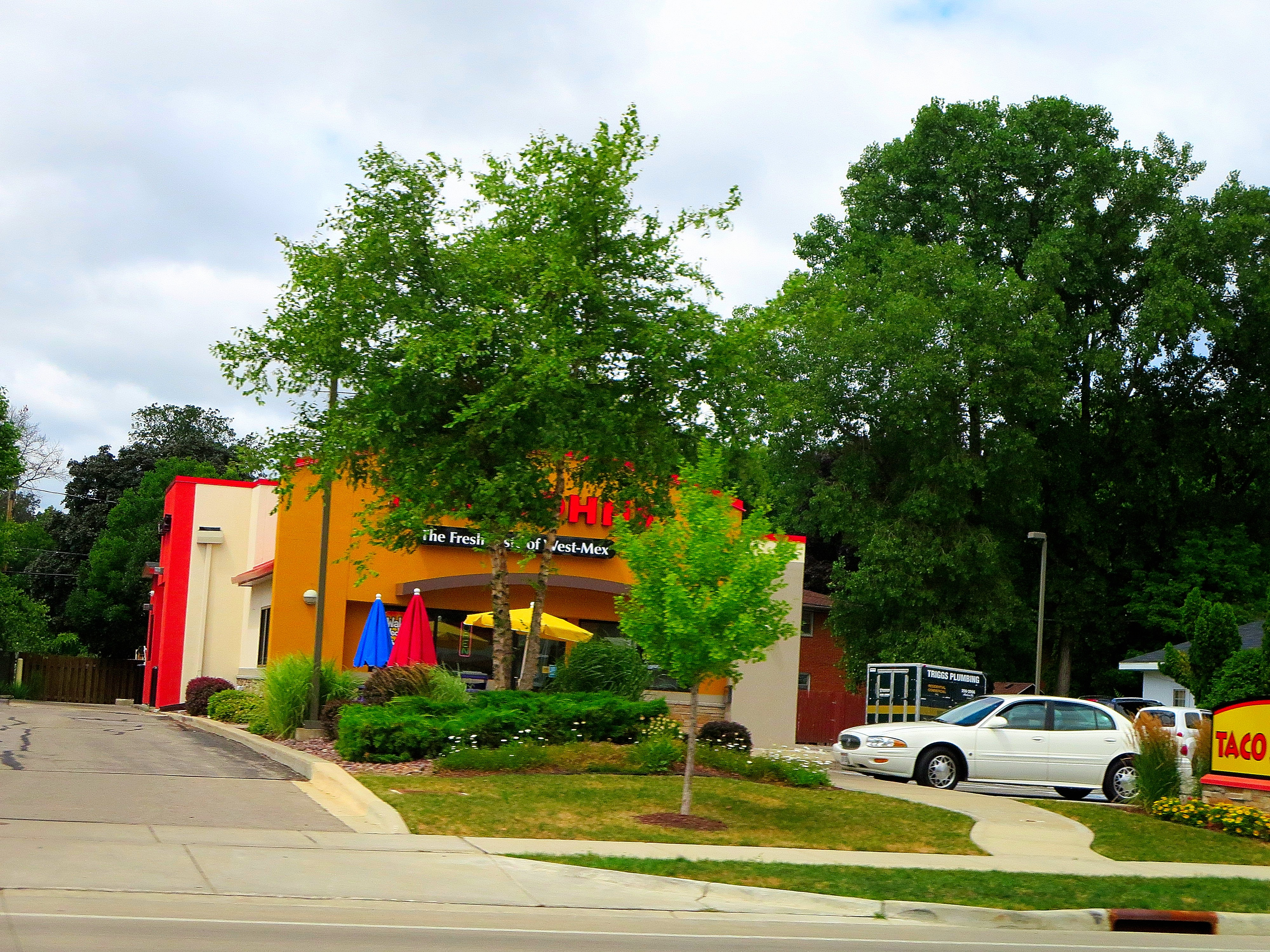
Taco John's with a tree-garden in front, Monona, Wisconsin

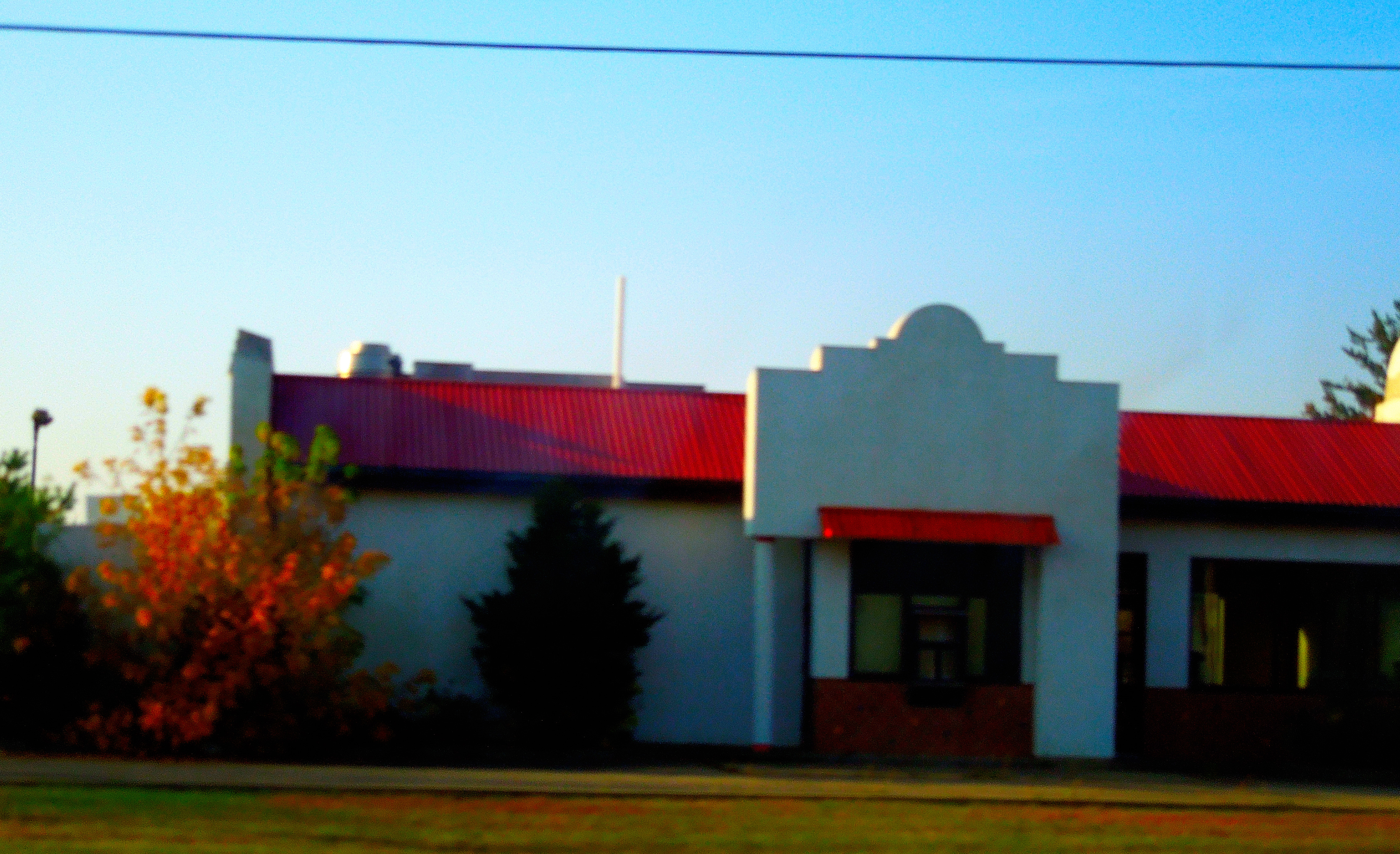
Abandoned retro Taco John's in Shawano, Wisconsin

== See also ==
- List of Mexican restaurants
