= Rax Roast Beef =

American fast food chain, founded 1967

From Rax to Rich's Inc.

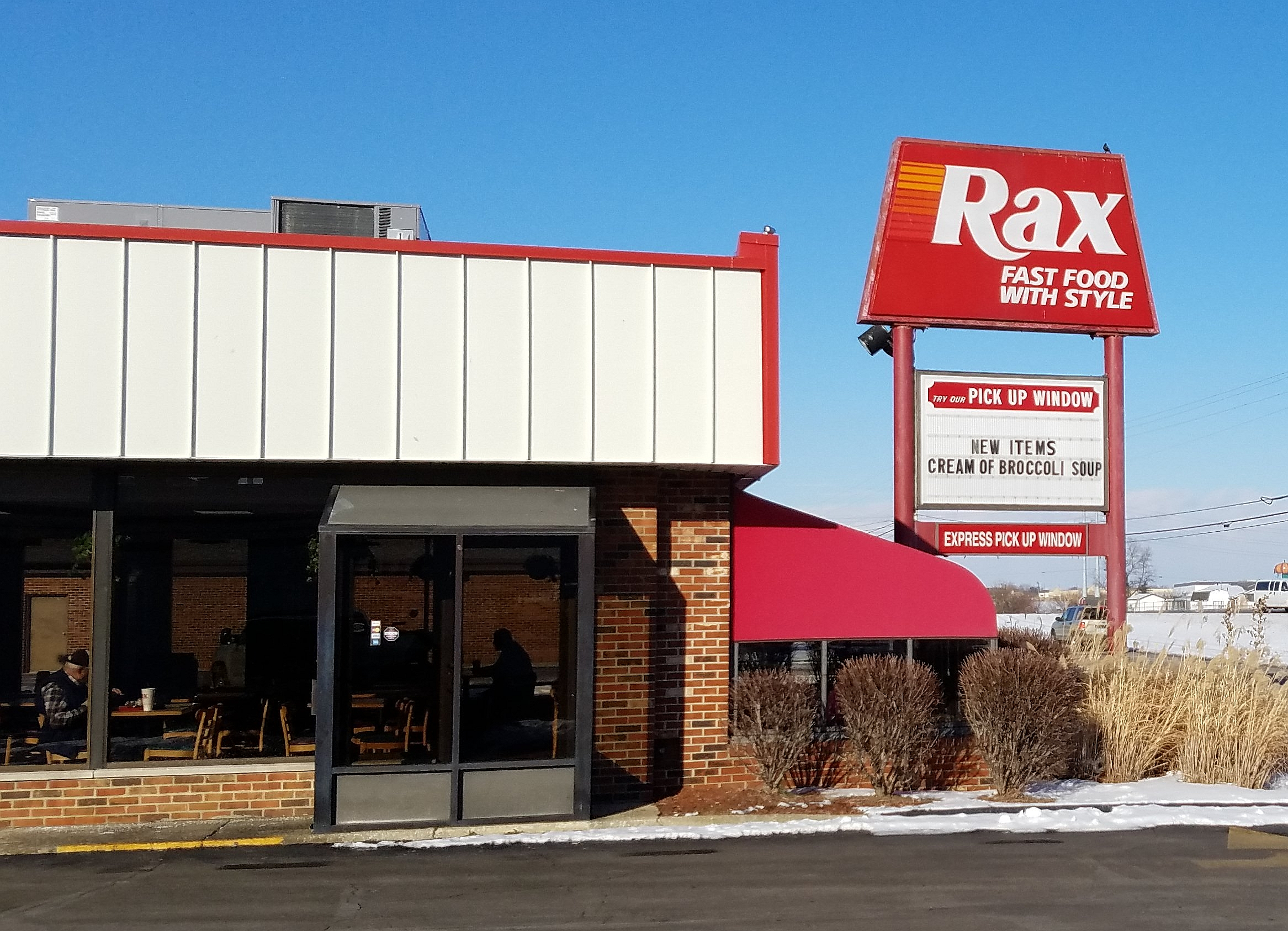
- Rax in Circleville, Ohio, formerly a Wendy's, 2018
- Trade name: Rax Roast Beef
- Formerly: JAX Roast Beef (1967–69; 1972–77); RIX Roast Beef (1969–72)
- Type: Private
- Industry: Fast food
- Founded: 1967; 59 years ago in Springfield, Ohio
- Founder: Jack Roschman
- Headquarters: Ironton, Ohio, U.S.
- Number of locations: 6 (2024)
- Key people: Jason Donahue (CEO)
- Products: Roast beef sandwiches, salad bar, shakes, baked potatoes, fries, soft drinks, wraps, sandwiches, chicken
- Owner: Rich Donohue
- Website: https://raxroastbeef.net/

Rax Roast Beef is a regional U.S. fast food restaurant chain specializing in roast beef sandwiches. The company has been through many iterations, declaring bankruptcy more than once, rising to as many as 504 locations in 38 U.S. states in the 1980s and falling to fewer than 10 locations in the 2020s. As of 2024, Rax is based in Ironton, Ohio; it has six restaurants in the states of Illinois, Ohio and Kentucky.

== History ==
=== Origins ===
Rax was originally known as "JAX Roast Beef", founded by Jack Roschman in 1967, in Springfield, Ohio. In 1969, Roschman sold the chain to General Foods, which then changed the name of the restaurants to "RIX Roast Beef". General Foods ran the chain until 1972, when most of the restaurants closed. The remaining 10 units were franchised units owned by the Restaurant Administration Corporation (RAC), headed by J. Patrick Ross, a franchisee of multiple restaurant chains including Wendy's, Ponderosa Steak House, and Long John Silver's.

RAC purchased the remainder of RIX from General Foods, and returned the JAX name to the restaurants. RAC eventually decided to focus on the roast beef business, and began franchising the chain. The JAX restaurants were renamed Rax in 1977 to be more suitable for trademarking and franchising, with the first Rax-branded franchise restaurant opening in Columbus, Ohio. RAC was renamed Rax Systems Inc., then again to Rax Restaurants Inc. in 1982. By then, Rax had grown to over 221 restaurants in 25 states.

In 1981, the chain introduced baked potatoes and salad bars to its menu. By June 1984, the 300th location had opened, in Fort Wayne, Indiana. In 1988, the company decided to reduce the size of its money-losing salad and food bars to help reduce expenses and refocus on sandwiches.

=== Peak ===
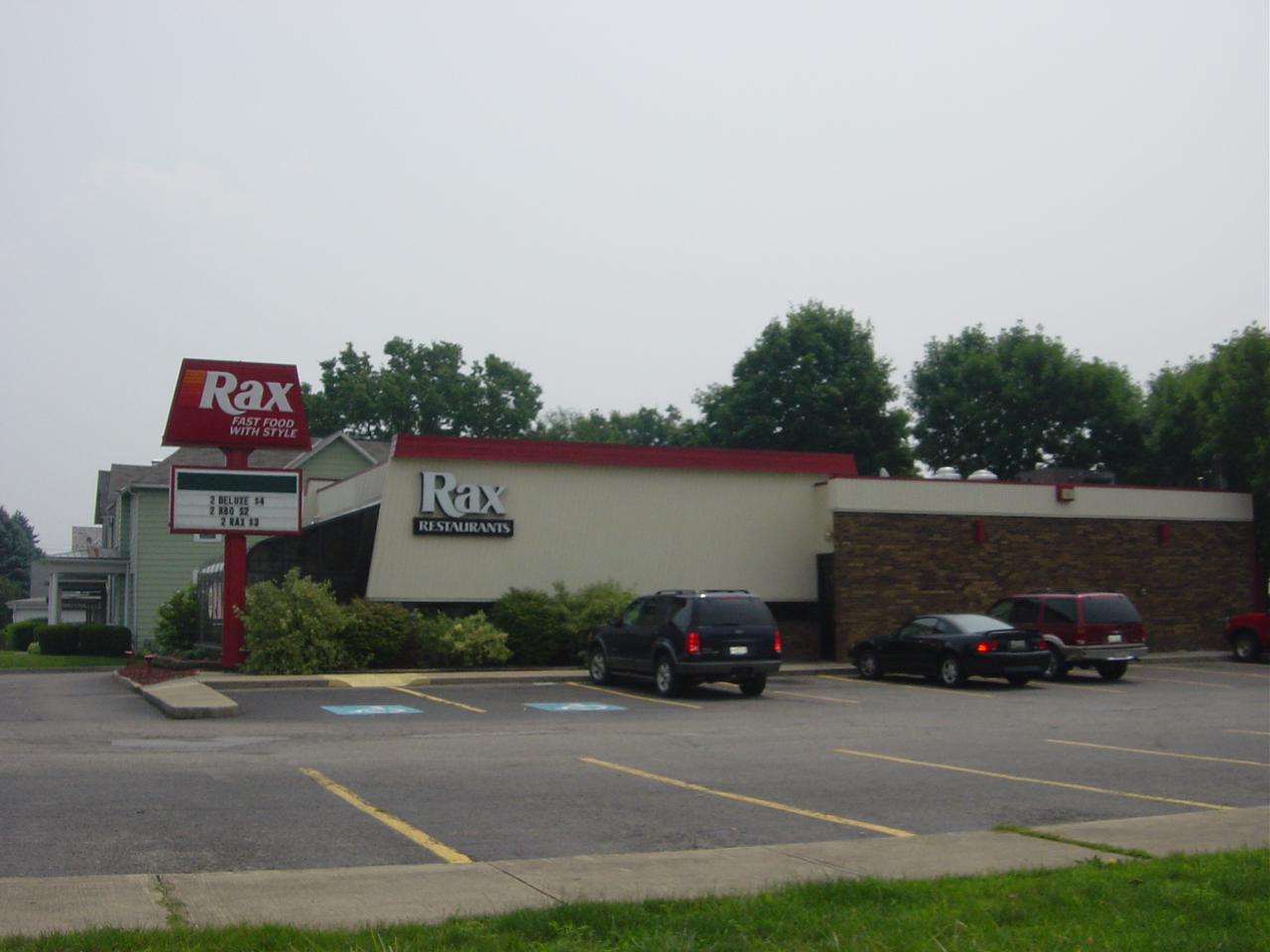
An older Rax, as shown in 2007, still in operation in Lancaster, Ohio: This location was later featured on an episode of Pittsburgh Dad.

At its peak in the 1980s, the Rax chain had grown to 504 locations in 38 states along with an unknown number of restaurants in Guatemala.

=== 1990s and bankruptcy ===
During the late 1980s, Rax began a series of almost continuous changes to its business model, diversifying its staple roast beef sandwich sales into a more eclectic menu. At various times Rax promoted baked potatoes, pizza, a dinner bar with pasta, Asian-themed food, a taco bar, an "endless" salad bar, and a dessert bar. Rax also began to transform its restaurants from typical fast food restaurant architecture into designs containing wood elements and solaria, with the intention of becoming the "champagne of fast food". This transformation drove away its core working-class customers and obscured its staple sandwich business, causing profits to plunge while other chains, such as Wendy's, took advantage of Rax's ideas and improved on them.

Compounding Rax's decline was a management buyout of the company in 1991 and numerous changes that occurred on the company board. The company attempted to convert under-performing outlets by forming joint ventures with Miami Subs and Red Burrito as they scaled back many of its stand-alone locations to its core markets, particularly in Ohio, Pennsylvania, and West Virginia.

By August 1992, the chain had faded into obscurity. That same month, a new advertising campaign was formulated with Deutsch Inc. to create a new animated promotion named "Mr. Delicious", a sportcoat-wearing, briefcase-toting, bespectacled, middle-aged man who constantly overshared his personal life while expressing gratitude for Rax restaurants. The campaign was ostensibly intended to attract adult customers to a 'value' menu. Despite the company's efforts to portray the Mr. D. campaign as successful, customers failed to respond. Three months after the arrival of Mr. Delicious, Rax Restaurants Inc. filed for bankruptcy.

=== 1994–2007 ===
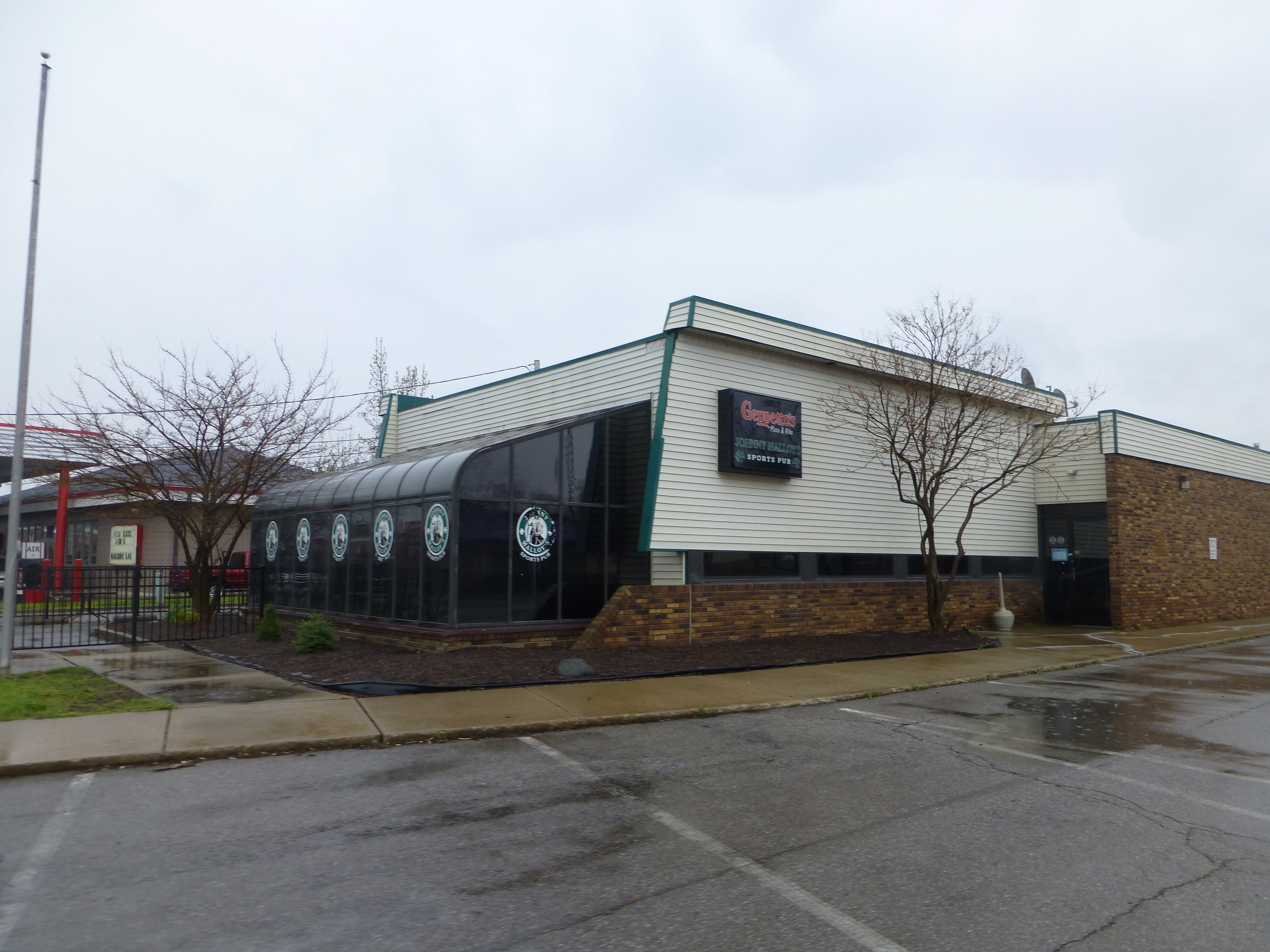
A former Rax restaurant in Vermilion, Ohio, that had been repurposed as a sports bar

In 1994, Rax Restaurants Inc. merged with North Carolina–based Franchise Enterprises Inc, renaming the company Heartland Food Systems Inc., and became a Hardee's franchisee. Heartland planned to convert all Rax restaurants into Hardee's by 1997. However, by 1996, the difficulty of converting Rax restaurants to Hardee's placed too much pressure on Heartland, and they were forced to once again file for Chapter 11 bankruptcy. As part of a turnaround plan, the company sold the Hardee's units it owned that were not originally Rax stores and changed the company's name back to Rax Restaurants Inc.

By 1996, the chain had dropped to 150 franchises, with 450 locations.

The company planned a revival for the Rax concept, including a new, simpler menu, a new store prototype, and a new logo and color scheme. However, in November 1996, Wendy's International made an offer to purchase 37 Rax restaurants, intending to convert most of them to Tim Hortons. This caused a change in strategy, and a buyer was sought for the remaining company-owned restaurants. In July 1997, the Rax brand was purchased by Cassady & Associates.

By December 2005, the brand was owned by Carpediem Management Co., with 51 locations, of which 11 were company-owned and 40 were franchisee-owned. As other fast food chains added kids' meals, Rax created its mascot, Uncle Alligator, who featured in all the kids' meals and toys, always involving some sport or activity (for example, skateboarding). In 2006, the Rax website indicated that 26 locations remained in Illinois, Indiana, Kentucky, Ohio, Pennsylvania, Virginia, and West Virginia, though many were closed by that point.

=== Since 2007 ===
In December 2007, Rich Donohue, a five-year franchise owner with a restaurant in Ironton, Ohio, purchased the Rax trademark. The new company, From Rax to Rich's Inc., purchased the name to bypass licensing costs and in an attempt to revitalize the brand. Subsequently, restaurants were opened in Circleville, Ohio, and Ashland, Kentucky as numerous regions were vacated, such as Pennsylvania and northern Ohio.

The last Rax in Indiana closed in 2011. By February 2015, nine freestanding locations remained in Illinois, Kentucky, Ohio, and West Virginia. The last Rax in West Virginia closed in March 2016, followed by three more in Ohio the same year, bringing the number of locations to five by 2017. Remaining Rax locations outside of Ohio are franchisee-owned, with the right to use the Rax name as long as the store is in operation.

By July 2018, the Rax franchise in West Union, Ohio had been co-branded with a pre-existing Long John Silver's restaurant in such a way that the Rax logo is not easily seen from the road or via Google Street View; this restaurant combination appeared to have disappeared by October 2020. There was a previous Long John Silver's/Rax combo in Georgetown, Ohio, that has since closed its doors.

In 2022, a new Rax location opened in New Carlisle, Ohio. As of December 2024, the company operated six locations: one in Illinois, one in Kentucky, and four in Ohio.

=== Marketing ===
While writing for website "Weird Marketing Tales", the author pointed out the large number of fatal marketing mistakes made by Rax when they conducted their advertising campaigns that eventually doomed the company. The author also pointed out that even the current company's official website was unable to give the correct number of operating stores at the time of the article's publication in 2023, the site having last been updated in 2016. Another writer also pointed out the incorrect number of operating restaurants still being displayed on the company's official website in April 2024.

According to snapshots taken by the Internet Archive, the company's official website was deactivated sometime between July and October 2025. As of 2026, the website has been reactivated and now displays the correct number of remaining locations.

==== Slogans ====
- "All the Right Stuff"
- "Fast Food with Style."
- "Gotta get back to Rax."
- "I'd Rather Rax, Wouldn't You?"
- "You can eat here."
