= Lorraine Collett =

American actress and model (1892–1983)

- Born: December 9, 1892; Kansas City, Missouri, U.S.
- Died: March 30, 1983 (aged 90); Fresno, California, U.S.

Lorraine Collett Petersen (December 9, 1892 – March 30, 1983) was an American model hired to promote a corporate trademark as the "Sun-Maid Girl".

Lorraine Collett was born to George Dexter Collett and Martha Elizabeth Falkenstein in Kansas City, Missouri. In 1915, Collett was attending high school and working part-time as a seeder and packer for the Griffin & Skelley Fruit Packing Company in Fresno, California for $15 a week. That May she was spotted by Leroy Payne, one of the executives of the raisin cooperative, while drying her curly brown hair and wearing her mother's red bonnet in the backyard of her family's home. She was hired to promote the California Associated Raisin Co. by handing out free samples at the Panama-Pacific Exposition and participating in an unusual promotion that had her dropping raisins from an airplane flying over San Francisco.

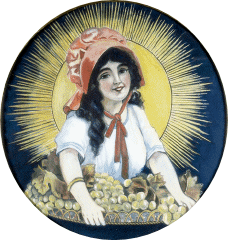
Original painting of Collett as the Sun-Maid Girl, ca. 1915

The company later commissioned a watercolor portrait of Collett from San Francisco artist Fanny Scafford to use as the basis for the "Sun Maid" corporate mascot devised by advertising executive E.A. Berg. Her likeness was trademarked and began appearing on raisin packaging in 1916. Use of Collett's image was so successful in promoting its products that by 1920 the company adopted "Sun-Maid Raisin Growers' Association" as its new name. Backed by an aggressive marketing push throughout the 20s, Sun-Maid managed to triple American consumption of raisins by the end of the decade. A revised version of her likeness continued to be featured on all Sun-Maid packaging through 1960. In 1974, Collett was presented with a commemorative plaque by Sun-Maid's president at a ceremony where she presented Scafford's original portrait and the red bonnet to the company in exchange for $1700. Sun-Maid executives donated Collett's bonnet to the Smithsonian Institution in 1987 on the occasion of the company's 75th anniversary.

After modeling for Sun-Maid, Collett moved to Hollywood to try to become an actress. She landed a small part in The Trail of the Lonesome Pine before returning to Fresno. There, she ran a restaurant for two years and later converted a former hospital into a nursing home. Collett died on March 30, 1983.
