= Whiplash the Cowboy Monkey =

Capuchin monkey performing in rodeos

Whiplash
- Other name: Pistol
- Species: Cebus sp.
- Sex: Male
- Born: c. 1987 (age 38–39); Miami, Florida
- Occupation: Rodeo performer
- Years active: c. 1990-present
- Owner: Kenny Petet
- Height: 30 in (76 cm)
- http://www.whiplashthecowboymonkey.com/

Whiplash the Cowboy Monkey (b. circa 1987) is a white-faced capuchin monkey known for riding a Border Collie at rodeos across the United States.

== Biography ==
=== Early life ===
Animal trainer Tommy Lucia purchased Whiplash as a baby from the widow of an animal enthusiast in Miami, Florida. As Lucia raised the young monkey, he introduced him to balancing on a saddle, then to the family's dogs. Over time, the dogs became used to carrying the capuchin.

=== Career ===
Whiplash has been riding since age two and travels with Kenny Petet, appearing at rodeos in North America and Europe. Since 2004, he has starred in a series of television advertisements for the fast-food chain Taco John's. He has also appeared on ESPN, Good Morning America, and The Today Show. On January 29, 2009, Whiplash was knighted in St. Paul, Minnesota, by the St. Paul Winter Carnival royalty at Tom Reid's Hockey City Pub near the Xcel Energy Center.
