= Sun-Maid =

American cooperative of raisin growers

Sun-Maid Growers of California
- Logo in use since April 2020
- Type: Agricultural cooperative
- Predecessor: California Associated Raisin Company
- Founded: 1912; 114 years ago
- Headquarters: Fresno, California, U.S.
- Area served: California
- Products: Raisins and dried fruit
- Website: www.sunmaid.com

Sun-Maid Growers of California is an American farmer-owned cooperative of raisin growers headquartered in Fresno, California. Sun-Maid is one of the largest raisin and dried fruit processors in the world. As a cooperative, Sun-Maid is made up of approximately 850 family farmers who grow raisin grapes within a 100-mile (160-kilometer) radius of the processing plant. Sun-Maid also sources dried fruit beyond this geographical area.

Sun-Maid produces more than 200 million pounds (90 million kilograms) of raisins per year. The raisins are grown in the Central Valley of California and then packed for consumer sales or sold as ingredients to other companies.

The collective is primarily known for its red box featuring the “Sun-Maid Girl” wearing a red sunbonnet and holding a tray of fresh grapes.

== History ==
In 1873, Francis T. Eisen planted an experimental vineyard of Muscat grapes near Fresno. By 1878, packaged raisins were being shipped out of the state, and by 1903, California was producing 120 million pounds of raisins a year. Once raisins were established as a marketable crop that grew and dried well in the sun, raisin grape-growing areas expanded rapidly in the late 19th century. By this time, prices swung drastically as more growers entered the market.

The earliest successful efforts to form a cooperative business by raisin growers began in 1898. In 1912, a group of growers in the San Joaquin Valley formed a cooperative under the name California Associated Raisin Company. H.H. Welsh served as the first chairman. In 1914, the Association launched the Sun-Maid brand to sell its product. As its first advertising campaign, they sent a train pulling 60 freight cars of raisins to Chicago, with each car displaying a banner with the slogan, "Raisins Grown by 6,000 California Growers." In 1918, the company opened a new facility near downtown Fresno, California.

By early 1922, the California Associated Raisin Company's membership comprised 85% of the state's raisin growers. That year, the organization changed its name to Sun-Maid Growers of California to identify more closely with its nationally recognized brand. In 1923, the organization's sales in North America, South America, Europe, and Asia was taken over by the Sunland Sales Association.

In 1964, a new facility opened in neighboring Kingsburg. The 640,000-square-foot (59,000-square-meter) facility sits on more than 100 acres (40 hectares), and is located 20 miles (32 kilometers) south of Fresno. The Kingsburg plant continues to serve as the international headquarters of Sun-Maid Growers of California, while the corporate headquarters is located in Fresno, California.

The 1972 season was devastated by a March frost, resulting in the loss of 55% of the grapes in the San Joaquin Valley. As a result, Sun-Maid shut down its factory for the first time since 1953. In 1978, rainfall again wiped out 75% of the region's crop, resulting in Sun-Maid losing around 80,000 tons of raisins. Torrential rain in 1982 cost Sun-Maid $200 million in raisin losses.

=== Sun-Diamond Growers ===
In 1980, Sun-Maid joined with Sunsweet Growers, Diamond Walnut Growers, Valley Fig Growers, and Hazelnut Growers of Oregon to create the Stockton-based Sun-Diamond Growers of California cooperative. Sun-Maid president Frank R. Light was named president and chief executive of Sun-Diamond, as well as each member organization. Sun-Diamond reported net sales as high as $522 million in 1983 and $517 million in 1984.

Sun-Maid suffered an accounting scandal in 1985 and 1986, where growers received $27.3 million in overpayments due to falsified records and inflated profits of $43 million. Light resigned prior to his planned retirement. By May 1986, 29% of the cooperative's 2,100 members had pulled out. The loss of 35% of its expected inventory forced Sun-Maid to contract with outside growers.

Sun-Diamond was reorganized so that each member cooperative had its own president, corporate staff was cut, and the organization's debt was secured, and a multi-year plan to repay the lost money and equity was developed. Barry F. Kriebel took over as president of Sun-Maid. Despite losing 500 of its 2,100 members, the cooperative recovered by 1987. That year, it managed $158.3 million in sales, its lowest—yet most profitable—in five years. A $13.35-million settlement to the company's accounting scandal was announced in September 1988.

In 1995, Sun-Diamond acquired Dole's dried fruit business for $100 million. In June 1996, the cooperative faced indictment on charges that it made illegal gifts to Agriculture Secretary Mike Espy and improper campaign contributions to his brother Henry Espy. Sun-Diamond, along with two of its lobbyists, were found guilty. As punishment, the collective was banned from participating in all federal food purchase programs for the next three years. However, Sun-Maid and several other member cooperative reached compliance agreements with the USDA by March 1997. A 1998 appeal ultimately set aside the $1.5 million fine. Sun-Diamond was dissolved in August 2000.

Sun-Maid recorded $250 million in net sales in 2005, the highest in the cooperative's history at the time. In 2012, Sun-Maid celebrated its 100th anniversary as a grower cooperative. At this time, it comprised 750 family farmers across 50,000 acres in Central Valley.

In 2019, the company relocated its corporate headquarters to Fresno. Operations continued at its processing plant in Kingsburg. In 2021, Sun-Maid acquired Plum Organics from Campbell Soup Company.

== Sun-Maid Girl ==
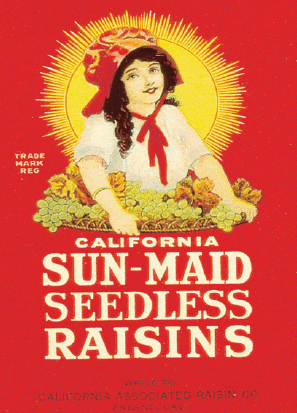
First package featuring Lorraine Collett (1916)

The original "Sun-Maid Girl" was a real person named Lorraine Collett. She attended the 1915 Panama–Pacific International Exposition in San Francisco as one of several young girls representing the California Associated Raisin Company. The Sun-Maid girls promoted the raisin industry by handing out raisin samples to visitors of the Expo while wearing white blouses with blue piping and blue sunbonnets.

A photograph of Collett appeared in the San Francisco Bulletin in 1915 and promoted Sun-Maid's activities at the Exposition. While working at the Expo in San Francisco, Collett posed at the Post Street studio of artist Fanny Scafford in the morning, and then spent the rest of the day working the Expo, where the Sun-Maid girls were by then all wearing red bonnets. The artist experimented with a variety of positions and props, finally settling on the pose with an overflowing tray of grapes and a glowing sunburst in the background.

In May 1916, company executives agreed Collett would become the personification of the company. Her image with the sunbonnet and the tray of grapes was updated in 1956 and again in 1970, using drawings made a decade earlier of company employee Delia von Meyer (Pacheco). Collett continued to make special appearances as the original Sun-Maid Girl until her death at the age of 90.

The current version was created in 1970 by John Lichtenwalner, a freelance commercial artist in San Francisco. Lichtenwalner, a graduate of Art Center in Los Angeles, used the previous versions of the Sun-Maid Girl to create a cleaner version of the character. The model for the updated portrait was a young actress/model, Liz Weide. The portrait was centered over a figurative sunburst. The artwork, sold as piecework to the Sun-Maid Raisin Co., has been reproduced internationally and is perhaps the artist's best-known work, unchanged for more than 40 years.

In 2006, the Sun-Maid Girl was animated for television commercials in which she walked and talked for the first time. The commercials were designed and produced by Synthespian Studios.

== Evolution of the brand ==
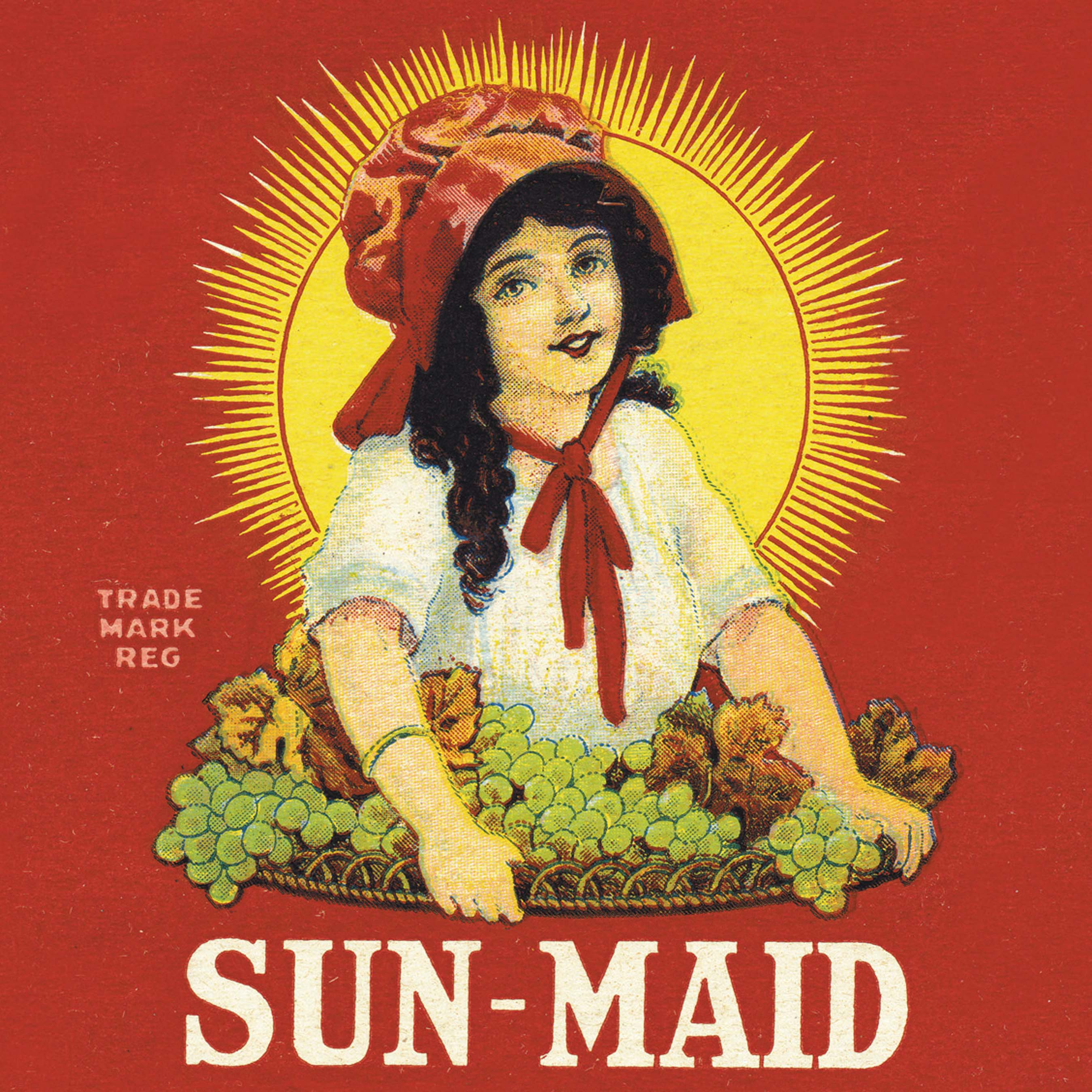
The California Associated Raisin Company begins using the “Sun-Maid” brand name and the painting of Lorraine Collett.

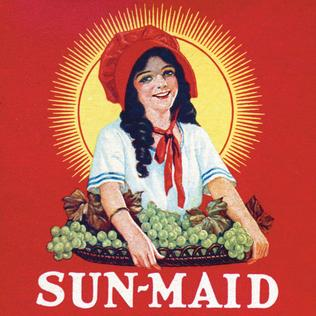
The original image of the Sun-Maid Girl is modified for the first time, giving her a bigger smile, brighter colors, and a stylized sun. This contemporary look was in style with the 1920s.

The trademark is updated for the second time. The sun was moved off-center, intensifying the effect of the sunshine with the bonnet casting a shadow across the Sun-Maid Girl's face.

Brighter colors and a geometric sun modernizes the logo, with the brand's name now printed in yellow, for a warmer, sunnier feel. This Sun-Maid Girl continued on packaging until 2020.
