= List of liquor advertising characters =

This is a list of mascot fictional characters used to market a brand of alcoholic beverage in advertisements and promotions.

Character	Product	Years used	Notes
Bacardi Bat	Bacardi rum	1862	An iconic symbol that is instantly recognizable to rum drinkers globally.
Beefeater Gin		1876	
Bud Ice penguin	Bud Ice beer	1996	known for ominously singing "Doo-be-doo-be-doo..."
Spuds MacKenzie	Bud Light beer	1987–1990	Described as hip by drunks.
Johnny, the Bud Light guy	Bud Light beer	1995	known for catchphrase "I love you, ma-a-a-n!"; played by Rob Roy Fitzgerald
Bud Knight	Bud Light beer	2017–2019; 2023	
Budweiser Frogs	Budweiser beer	1995	One frog says "Bud," another says "weis," and a third says "er." This is often repeated throughout the company's ads, in that order.
Frank and Louie, lizards	Budweiser beer	1998	main adversaries to the Budweiser frogs.
Budweiser Clydesdales	Budweiser beer	1930s–present	usually pulling a hitch of Budweiser with a Dalmatian riding in it. Also appear playing football against each other.
Joe Camel	Camel cigarettes	1987–1997	
Captain Morgan rum		1944–present	based on Sir Henry Morgan
Mabel the waitress	Carling Black Label beer	1950s	played by Jean Goodspeed (1951 through mid-1950s)
Coors Light Twins	Coors Light beer		played by the Klimaszewski Twins
Guinness Toucan	Guinness beer	1928–present	in his creative interpretation, to balance a glass of Guinness beer on its nose.
Hamm's Beer bear	Hamm's Beer	debuted 1952	
Elephant and Bartender	Jax Beer	late-1950s and early-1960s	voiced by Mike Nichols and Elaine May
Frank Bartles and Ed Jaymes	Bartles & Jaymes wine coolers	1985–1991	played by David Joseph Rufkahr (Bartles) and Dick Maugg (Jaymes)
Jägermeister deer	Jägermeister liquer	1934	
Keith Stone	Keystone Light beer	2009–present	played by Mitchell Jarvis
Willie the Kool penguin	Kool cigarettes	debuted 1930s	
Little old winemaker	Italian Swiss Colony wine	1960s	played by Ludwig Stössel, voiced by Jim Backus
Marlboro Man	Marlboro cigarettes	debuted 1954	Wayne McLaren died in 1992 of lung cancer David McLean, died in 1995 of lung cancer Dick Hammer, died in 1998 of lung cancer Eric Lawson died in 2014 of COPD; Robert "Bob" Norris, died 2019 (natural causes, was actually a non-smoker)
The Miller Lite Beer Refs	Miller Lite beer	2004–present	portrayed by Reggie Miller, Luke Wilson, and J.J. Watt.
The Swedish Bikini Team	Old Milwaukee beer	1991	A fictional group of attractive blonde women used in television advertising campaigns.
