= Malektronic Rocketman =

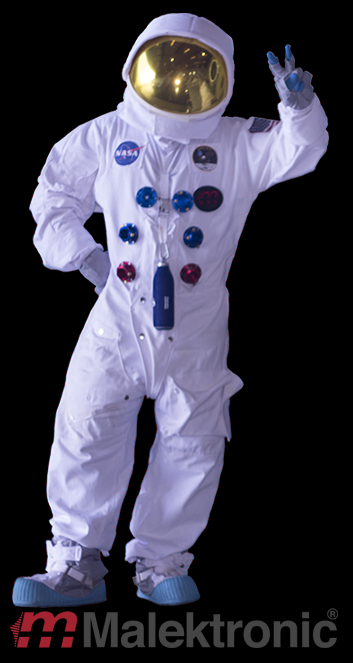
- Rocketman giving his favorite gesture
- First appearance: 2015
- Created by: Ben Malek
- Portrayed by: Undisclosed SuperFans
- Voiced by: Rocketman does not talk

In-universe information
- Alias: Tampa Bay Lighting Astronaut; Lighting Astronaut; TB Astronaut; Astro; Tampa Bay Astro
- Occupation: Malektronic Mascot; Lighting SuperFan
- Nationality: American

Malektronic Rocketman is an astronaut used as the mascot for Malektronic LLC. The Rocketman is also known as Tampa Bay Lightning Astronaut, Lighting Astronaut, and TB Astronaut.

The Rocketman came to fame during the 2014–15 NHL season with main appearances occurring during the 2015 Stanley Cup playoffs. Rocketman has also appeared in numerous news broadcasts and on ESPN's flagship show SportsCenter.

== Creation ==
Rocketman was created by Malektronic CEO Ben Malek. Rocketman was originally part of a marketing campaign in partnership with the Tampa Bay Lightning. Malektronic Bluetooth speakers were given away at the game by Rocketman. After one of the speaker giveaways at a Tampa Bay Lightning game Ben decided to have the Rocketman sit in one of his rink-side seats. It was shortly after when people started to notice and post pictures and questions on social media about it.

== History ==
The Malektronic Rocketman (Astronaut) was originally seen at the Tampa Bay Lightning vs L.A. Kings on February 7, 2015. However, Rocketman gained more nationwide exposure at a subsequent game on March 25, 2014 where the Tampa Bay Lightning played the Florida Panthers. The video and images from that game started the Rocketman on a viral social journey that would last all the way into and through the 2015 Stanley Cup playoffs and well into the start of the 2015–16 NHL season.

== Actors ==
More than one person has worn the Rocketman suit. Depending on the event they are attending there may be more than one actor donning the suit.

== Superfan vs Marketing Ploy ==
There has been debate over the novelty of the Rocketman. The original social belief on the sight of an astronaut at hockey games was that it was a superfan. Latter many news agencies thought they were exposing Rocketman by reporting its "just" some company.

While Malektronic will not deny the use of an astronaut at the games was part of some fun marketing they will still swear the superfan aspect is valid. Most of Malektronic’s employees are dedicated Tampa Bay Lightning fans and Malektronic CEO Ben Malek is a big fan of the Tampa Bay Lightning where he is a long time season ticket holder and a Suite owner. Some fans even bestow the "Superfan" title on Ben.

== The Chicago Connection ==
During the 2014-2015 Stanley Cup Championship there became an interesting twist. Rocketman was attending all home games during the Championships. Once it came down to Tampa Bay Lightning vs Chicago Blackhawks some social media and news sources found out CEO Ben Malek used to be a die hard Chicago fan. Ben assured Tampa fans and friends he and Rocketman were still behind Tampa Bay 100% in the playoffs.
