= List of Australian and New Zealand advertising characters =

Many advertising characters used as mascots and characters by companies in Australia and New Zealand are similar to those used in the United States and the United Kingdom. There are, however, quite a number that are unique to these two nations.

Many advertisements shown on New Zealand television are made in Australia, and many Australian and New Zealand companies operate similar businesses on both sides of the Tasman Sea. As such, there is considerable overlap in advertising characters and mascots found in the two countries.

The following is a list of notable mascots and characters created specifically for advertising purposes in Australia and New Zealand, listed alphabetically by the product they represent.

Product	Character	Years used	Notes
ANZ Bank (NZ)	The Sharma family	ca 2019–	
ASB Bank (NZ)	Ira Goldstein	2000–2010	Played by American actor Steve Mellor
Briscoes (NZ)	The Briscoes Lady	ca 1990–	Played by Tammy Wells
Bundaberg Rum (Aus)	Bundy R. Bear	1980s on radio	
Campbell's Cash & Carry supermarkets (Aus)	Delilah	1980s–1990s	
Chesdale Cheese (NZ)	Ches and Dale	1960s–1980s	Don Couldrey and Robert Jenkins created Ches and Dale for agency Dormer Beck
Colgate Toothpaste (Aus & NZ)	Mrs Marsh	1970s–1980s	
Commission for Financial Capability (NZ)	Sorted Mouse	2001–present	
Cookie Time Cookies (NZ)	Cookie Muncher	at least the 1980s–present	
Creamoata (cereal, NZ)	Sergeant Dan	1920s–1950s	
Crimsafe (Aus & NZ)	Kimmy's dad	2010–present	
Eta margarine & peanut butter (Aus)	Rita the Eta Eater	1970s–1980s	
Eta peanut butter (NZ)	Eta Nut 1001	1960s–1980s	
Expol Insulation (NZ)	Polly the Penguin	2000s-present	
Four Square (grocery stores, NZ)	Mr. Four Square ("Cheeky Charlie")	since at least the 1960s	Created by artist Dick Frizzell, who has since used the character in several of his paintings
Frosty Boy ice cream (Aus & NZ)	Frosty Boy	since at least the 1960s	
Griffins biscuits (NZ)	Cookie Bear	since at least the 1970s	Don Donovan created Cookie Bear for the agency Carlton-Carruthers du Chateau. The famous “Dum-de-doo” was voiced by actor David Weatherly
Home Ice Cream (Aus)	Delivery Dan	1999–present	
Home Timber & Hardware (Aus)	Rusty and Sandy	1993–present	
Kiwibank	Buck	2026-present	
Instant Kiwi (lottery scratch card, NZ)	Doug and Mexi-Doug	2008–present	
Life. Be in it. (health campaign, Aus)	Norm	1975	Also aired in the United States
Melbourne Metropolitan Board of Works (Aus)	Wally	1980s	
Metro Trains Melbourne (rail network, Aus)	Beans (Dumb Ways to Die)	2012–present	The music video for the original campaign was sung by Tangerine Kitty, featuring colorful characters resembling humanoid beans that engage in foolish and dangerous actions, devised by the advertising agency McCann Australia. As of 2021, the franchise as a whole is now owned by Australian video game company PlaySide Studios since 2021.
Mitre 10 Mega stores (NZ)	The Big Guy	2004–present	
Mortein (insect spray, Aus)	Louie the Fly	1957–present	The Australian author Bryce Courtenay created Louie the Fly as a copywriter for the advertising agency McCann Erickson. James Joseph White wrote the jingle, Geoffrey Morgan Pike created the animation and Louie was voiced by actor Ross Higgins. Louie also in New Zealand since the 1980s
Nestle Milky Bar chocolate (Aus & NZ)	The Milky Bar Kid	1969-1990s	The ad used live actors until the 1990s when the Milky Bar Kid became animated. The first Milky Bar Kid was first played by Terry Brook in 1961 in the UK. Over the years the Milky Bar Kid has been portrayed by many people including Australian actor Conrad Coleby.
New Zealand Electoral Commission	Orange Guy	ante 2000	
Nine Network	The Smiling Dot	1975	Used during the "Living Color" campaign
NRMA Insurance (Aus)	Wallace Fairweather	Mid-1990s	Radio in NSW & Victoria
Pak'nSave (NZ)	Stick Man	since 2008	Voiced by comedian Paul Ego
Palmolive dishwashing liquid (Aus & NZ)	Madge	1971–1980s	Australian version based on US commercials, with Robina Beard playing Jan Miner's role
Pizza Hut delivery (Aus)	Dougie the Pizza Delivery Boy	1994–1997, 2002–present	
Progressive Insurance (Australia)	Kitty, the Progressive Insurance Girl	2011–present	Australian counterpart of Progressive's Flo in the United States, with Holly Austin playing Stephanie Courtney's role
Sky (New Zealand) (NZ)	Bert Badger	2000s	
Slip-Slop-Slap (health campaign, Aus)	Sid the Seagull	Debuted 1981	
Smith's Chips (Aus)	Gobbledok	late 1980s–early 1990s	
Sunny Queen Farms (Aus)	Sunny The Egg	2009–present	
Supercheap Auto (Aus)	Steve Lenda	2003–present	Also used in NZ
Streets (ice cream) (Aus)	Paddle pop lion and Bubble O' Bill	2003–present	Also used in NZ
Telecom New Zealand	Spot	1991–1998	Spot the dog's real name was Sandy; the name Spot was an acronym for Services and Products of Telecom.
Totalspan	Sam		Metal dog
TVNZ	The Goodnight Kiwi	1981–1994	The minute-long Goodnight Kiwi clip was animated by Sam Harvey in 1981. Its last broadcast was in 1994.
The Comedy Channel (Aus)	C'fer	c.1996–2003	
Tiger Tea (NZ)	Tony the Tiger	1950s–1970s	
Tip Top ice cream (NZ)	Moggy Man	1960s	
Toyota Masterclass cars (NZ)	Ernie	c.2002–2007	
Mr Toys Toyworld (Toy retailers) (Aus & NZ)	TW, The Toyworld Bear	since at least the 1980s	Last spotted at the Toyworld 40th birthday gala
Tuckerbag supermarkets (Aus)	Tucker Bag	1980s	
Turners Automotive Group (NZ)	Tina from Turners	2021–present	played by Sieni Leo'o Olo (Bubbah)
Yellow Pages (Aus)	Jan	2000–present	"Not happy, Jan!" led to 'Not happy, John!' campaign
Mr Whippy (Aus)	Mr Whippy	1962–present	
XXXX (Aus)	Mr Fourex	1924–present	
YoGo (Aus)	YoGo Gorilla	1990–present	

== See also ==
- List of Australian sporting mascots
- List of American advertising characters
- List of European and British advertising characters
