= Bulla Dairy Foods =

Australian dairy company

- Type: Privately owned
- Founder: Thomas Sloan
- Headquarters: Derrimut, Victoria
- Key people: Allan Hood (CEO)
- Website: http://www.bulla.com.au/

Bulla Dairy Foods is an Australian dairy company that manufactures national and export ranges of ice cream, table cream, yoghurt, sour cream, cottage cheese, and imitation cream under various brands. The business was established in 1910 and subsequently became a partnership among three inter-related families, who still continue to own and run the business. The company's name was established from the origin of a place in Victoria, Australia, and the business has continued for over 100 years. Bulla Dairy Foods has expanded internationally, exporting its products to 17 countries, as well as supplying their products nationally within Australia to supermarket retailers. The company employs more than 600 people across three manufacturing sites in Colac, Dandenong and Mulgrave, all in Victoria, and a head office and distribution centre in Derrimut, Melbourne. In 2015, Bulla Dairy Foods released a new campaign with the tagline "Unfakeable" to emphasise the company's Australian heritage.

== History ==
=== Founding ===
Bulla Dairy Foods was founded in 1910 by Thomas Sloan, in Moonee Ponds, Melbourne, as the Bulla Cream Company. His brother William owned a farm in Bulla, which provided the milk used to make the cream. The copper cans filled with milk were transported to Moonee Ponds and were labelled "Bulla", so the company's name was unintentionally created.

Thomas had developed a new method of thickening cream by burning wood, creating heat to pasteurise the cream in copper cans. The product was distributed by horse and cart, and the copper cans were draped with wet bags to keep them cool during transportation. In 1914, Thomas Sloan's brother in law, Hugh Anderson, became a partner in the business. In 1918, Hugh Anderson's brother Jack also joined the Bulla Cream Company. Thus the company was operated by three interrelated families. The responsibilities of the business operations were split among the three men: marketing and product distribution were the responsibility of Jack Anderson and Thomas Sloan, while Hugh Anderson was responsible for production.

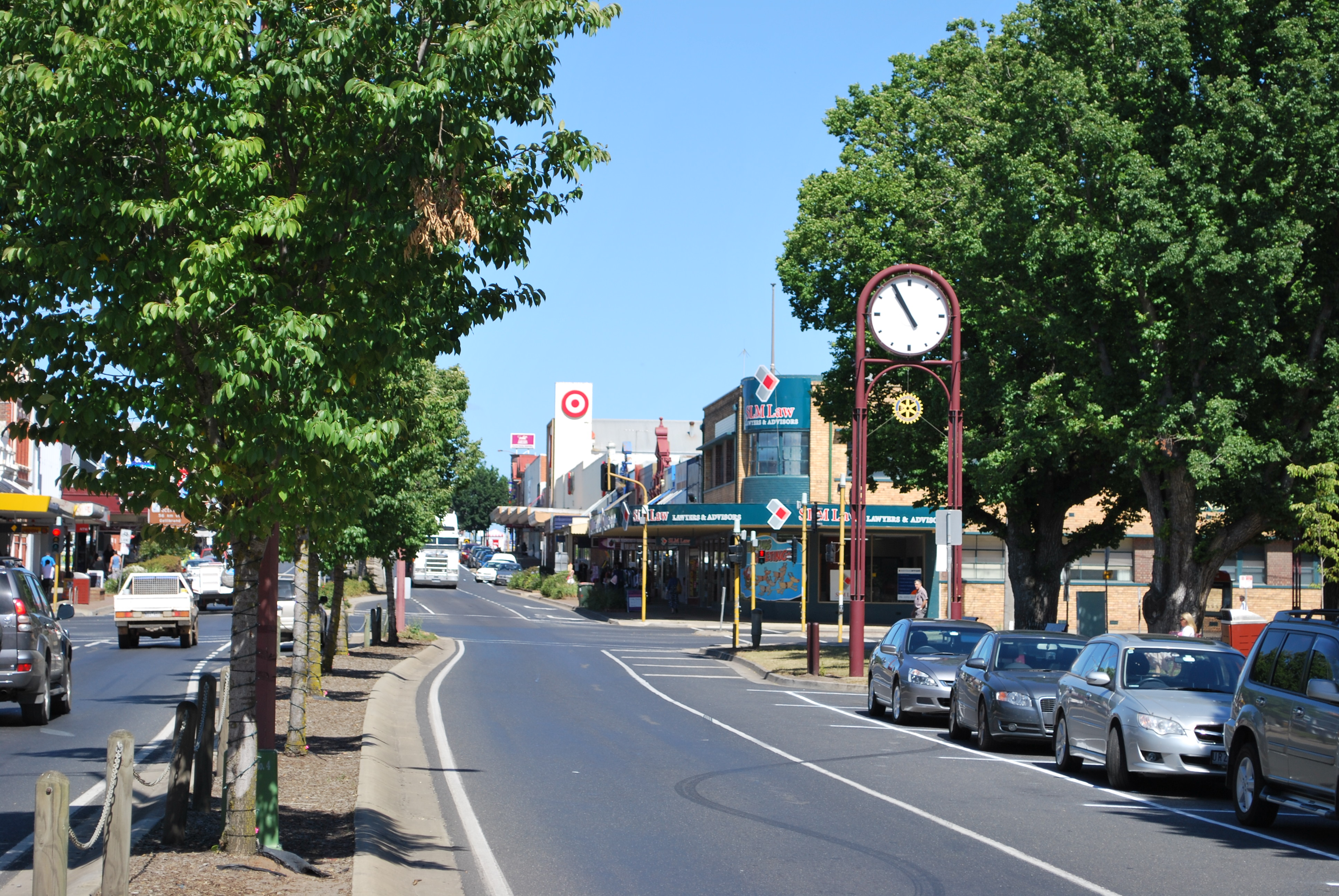
Murray Street, Colac, Victoria, where Bulla has sold and produced ice cream

In 1914, the first expansion of the company included the purchase of a butter factory in Drysdale, on the Bellarine Peninsula. In 1921, the business bought land in the Western District town of Colac to build a new factory. The factory in Drysdale was sold and the operation was moved to Colac in 1922.

Bulla had initially started its business in the Melbourne suburb of Moonee Ponds and, in 1928, Bulla purchased premises in Arden Street, North Melbourne for its new headquarters, and the site of its cream bottling plant and distribution. By 1929, Bulla had begun to produce ice cream from its factory in Murray Street, Colac. In the following year, Bulla purchased the Colac factory that produced Regal ice cream. Bulla continued to produce ice cream under the brand name Regal until rebadging it as Bulla Ice Cream in 2004.

The company had focused on portraying Bulla as a family business but, in the late 1990s, it began to hire senior members who were not descendants of the three founding families. In 2000, a 6,400 square metre site on Forest Street, Colac, was planned for manufacturing the company's dairy products, and it became operational in 2003.

=== Recent developments ===
In 2009, Bulla purchased the remainder of the ice cream business that Fonterra sold to Nestle and they also purchased the Brownes tub ice cream range in Western Australia. By 2014, Bulla had received an Australian Cadbury ice cream licence, that allowed the company to produce Cadbury Marvelous Creations ice cream. The licensing rights included production, distribution and marketing of the ice cream in Australia. In May 2014, Bulla Dairy Foods entered into a partnership with the Australian Dairy Farmers Cooperation (ADFC). They supply fresh milk to Bulla daily and other locations in Victoria. In 2015, the company announced the launch of a new advertising campaign that would signify Bulla's Australian origins and heritage. The tagline included the phrase "Unfakeable”, to highlight Bulla's 105 years of production. The advertising campaign included two television commercials that advertised their cream and ice cream products. In 2017, Bulla Dairy foods moved to a direct farm supply of milk, instead of receiving it externally from a third party. In June of the same year, Bulla announced that it would be adopting a new Country of Origin labelling, to show support for Australian farmers and to highlight the company's Australian heritage. In January 2020, Bulla released a range of ice cream entitled ‘Murray Street’. This range was to commemorate making ice cream on Murray Street in Colac, Victoria for more than 90 years.

== Operations ==
Bulla Dairy Foods employs more than 600 people within Victoria, Australia and has grown to an international level, exporting their products to 17 countries. The company's head office is located in Derrimut, Melbourne and the manufacturing sites are in Colac, Dandenong and Mulgrave, Victoria.

=== Production ===
Bulla Dairy Foods carries 160 units of stock keeping and this stock is produced and manufactured in a seven-day cycle. Bulla's supply of milk is directly sourced from Australia and the company uses specific methods of pasteurising milk using ultra heat treatment. Bulla's main manufacturing sites are in Colac, Victoria, Mulgrave, Victoria and Dandenong, Victoria where the company has employed more than 450 people in those two sites. In their production site, Bulla has introduced two MTU onsite energy cogeneration modules, due to a grant from the Australian Governments Clean technology food and Foundries investment program. This instalment provides 80 per cent of the power requirement for its frozen dairy manufacturing plant in Colac. The instalment of the cogeneration modules was aimed to improve the company's ecological footprint and reduce energy costs. Prior to the instalment of this module, the manufacturing site at Colac used 86 percent of electricity and 11 percent of natural gas. Bulla is a member of the Australian Packaging Covenant, which is an organisation to limit environmental impacts of product packaging, this includes recyclable packaging. In May 2019, Bulla Dairy foods had a set price of milk solids at 7 dollars per kilogram and in the following month the company moved to a price of $7.20 per kilogram. The increase was a result of a greater competition for milk in the current market. Bulla Dairy Foods has more than 100 suppliers within Victoria and this provides more than 1 million litres of milk.

=== International Exports ===
Bulla Dairy Foods has annual gross sales of approximately $400 million and is the largest selling branded cream in Australia. Bulla has an international presence in many southeast Asian countries, including Singapore, and China. These overseas exports contribute to approximately five per cent of Bulla's yearly profit and international export revenues are about five to ten million dollars. The company has introduced their dairy range into the Chinese market, with Bulla's frozen products being sold in stores in China and also on two online food retail platforms. In the Chinese market, Bulla has sold their products in both convenience stores and grocery supermarkets with approximately 800 million people having access to the online platforms.

== Products ==
Bulla Dairy Foods products are sold in a variety of stores and grocery supermarkets nationally in Australia and internationally. This range of dairy products includes; Bulla's ‘Creamy Classics’ tub ice cream, Ice cream sticks, Bulla's ‘Double Cream’ made with 45% Milk fat, pure, thick and light cream in tubs, flavoured and natural Yogurt tubs and low fat cottage cheese.

Bulla has introduced dairy products to cater for nutritional intake such as products that are 97% fat free, products that are low in sugar and have no artificial additives and colouring, including a “School Approved Range” to cater for school kids. Bulla produces their products in a range of sizes including individual portions for yogurt and larger family portions. Bulla dairy foods target their products to people including school children and families. In April 2012, Bulla launched their Dollop Cream Portions product.

=== Ice cream ===
Bulla's ‘Creamy Classics’ tub ice cream increased their percentage of customers who bought ice cream, in 2015 it was 12.5% and increased to 16.6% four years later. The overall purchasing of Bulla's ice cream has decreased, in 2015, 32.2% of ice cream buyers purchased Bulla. In 2019, this has decreased 30.9%. As of 2019, Bulla is the leading brand of ice cream bought by Australian ice cream buyers.

In 2018, Bulla dairy foods introduced Cinnamon Donut flavoured ice cream sticks, as well as a limited edition Bulla crunch variety with the addition of 2 new milkshake flavours; blue heaven and tangy pineapple.

=== Food safety ===
In July 2019, the New South Wales Food Authority recalled Bulla's ‘Ready to Decorate Ice Cream Cake Base’ for the presence of soy, an undeclared allergen. The cake was sold in Australian grocery retailers and there was concern for consumer allergies and was deemed a food safety hazard.

== Markets ==
Bulla exports their products to locations around the world including; New Guinea, Fiji, China, Singapore, South Korea, Malaysia, Indonesia, Thailand, The Philippines, Japan, Hong Kong.

== Awards and recognition ==
In 2012, Bulla's Dollop Cream Portions was awarded the ‘best new foodservice product’, for relevance and innovation at the Fine Food Australia Show. In 2013, Bulla won the grand champion dairy product from Dairy Australia for their premium sour cream. Bulla was named the best food producer by the Royal Agricultural society in 2014 and the company also received a President's Medal. In 2016, Bulla Dairy Foods received the DTS Food Laboratories Award from The Dairy Industry Association of Australia for their sour cream 200mL for its use of dip, cream and dessert. The sour cream was given 19.33 points out of 20. In the same year, the association gave an award for Judges Choice for Bulla's Fairy Bread ice cream due to its creativity. In the same year, Bulla's Creme Fraiche won the grand champion dairy product from Dairy Australia. In 2018, Bulla's Creamy Classics Ice Cream Sandwich was voted product of the year by the Consumer Survey of Product innovation. In 2019 and 2020 Bulla was a finalist recipient for a people's choice award from The Australian Grand Dairy Awards, they were placed in their top three category for best cream for their ‘double cream’ product.

== See also ==
- Dairy farming in Australia
