= Barbie Pond on Avenue Q =

Art installation in Washington, D.C., U.S.

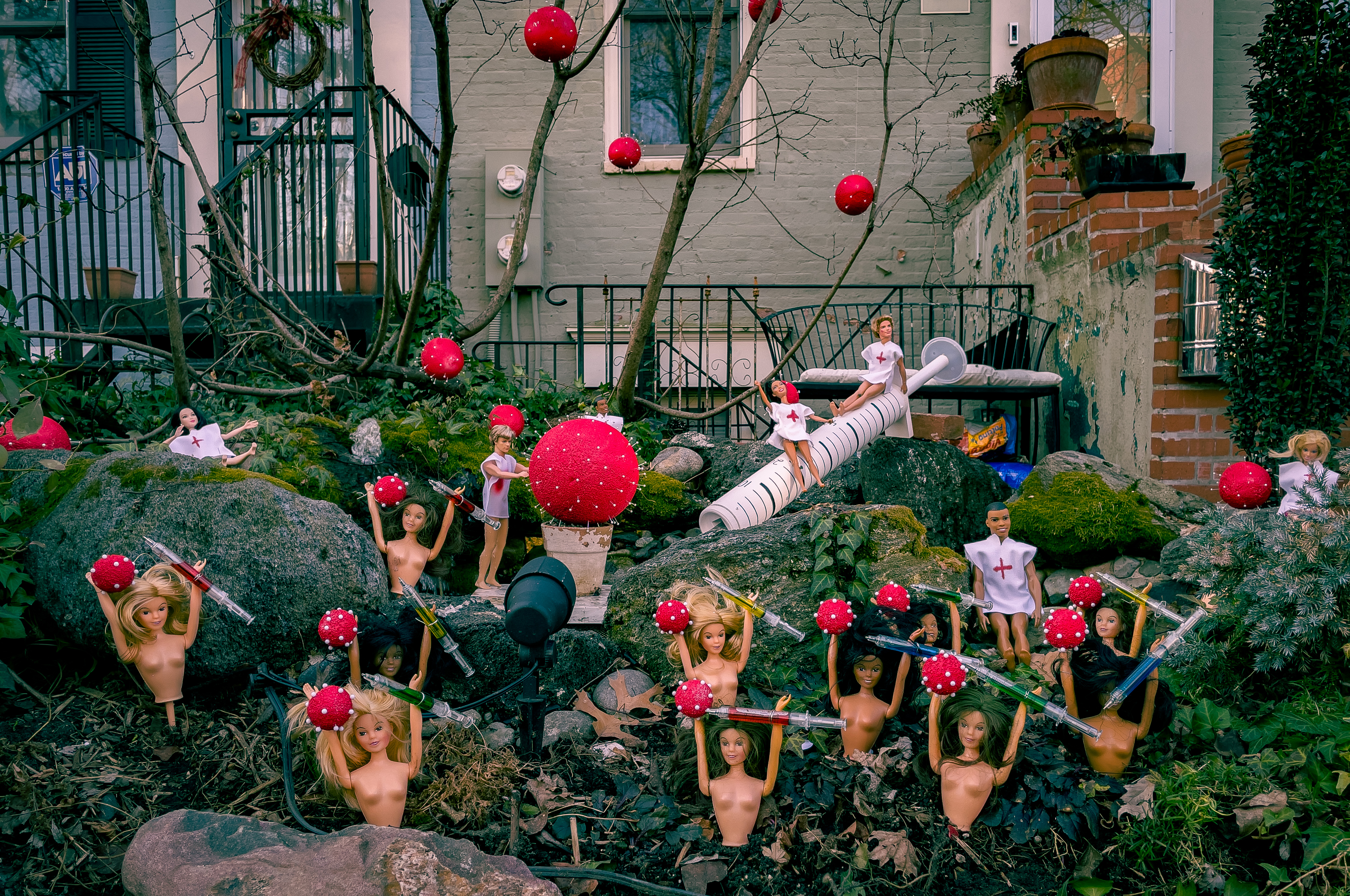
- Barbie Pond on Avenue Q in March 2021
- Interactive map of Barbie Pond on Avenue Q
- Coordinates: 38°54′40″N 77°02′03″W

Barbie Pond on Avenue Q is a community art installation that features a collection of Barbie dolls arranged in various scenes around a small pond in front of a private residence. The displays change regularly to reflect current events, holidays, and social issues.

== Overview ==
The Barbie Pond on Avenue Q community art installation located on Q Street in the Dupont Circle neighborhood of Washington, D.C. The display, which features Barbie dolls posed in various thematic scenes, has become a local landmark, known for its humorous and timely depictions of current events, holidays, and cultural moments. The installation, created by three friends, Craig, Jon, and Brent, has garnered a dedicated following and is considered a unique reflection of the Dupont Circle community.

== History ==
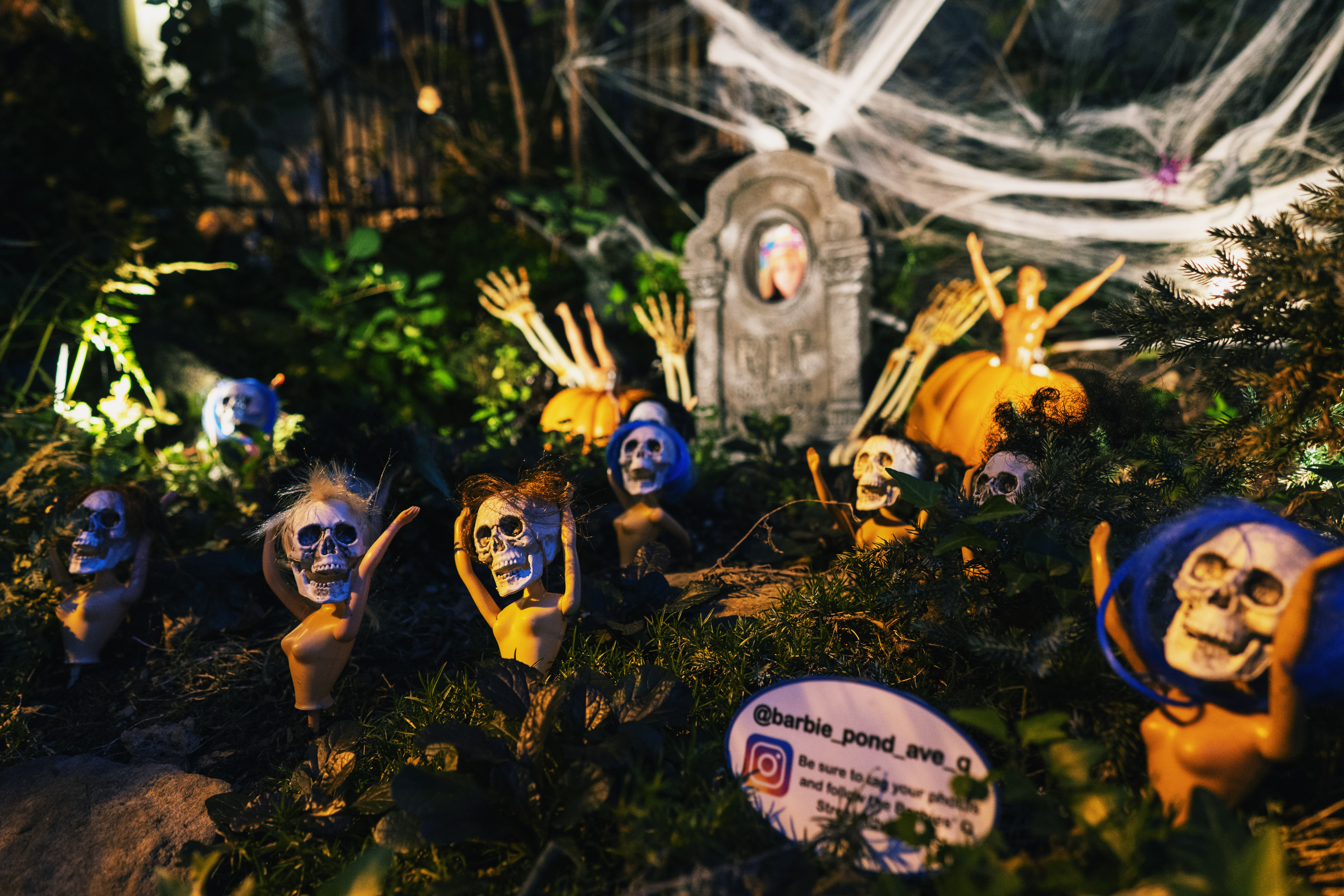
The Halloween 2018 edition of Barbie Pond on Avenue Q.

The Barbie Pond began informally c. 2011 when Brent, the homeowner of the property where the installation sits, placed cake toppers in the garden area in front of his house. After positive reactions from neighbors, the owner added full-sized Barbie dolls and began creating themed displays. Craig and Jon, two friends, joined the effort c. 2014; together, the trio has since transformed the pond into a regularly updated art piece. Over time, the Barbie Pond grew in both size and significance, becoming a staple of local life.

The Barbie Pond displays often celebrate holidays and cultural events, such as Christmas, Hanukkah, Cinco de Mayo, and Pride Month. The installations also comment on political and social issues, including elections and LGBTQ+ rights. In one scene following the U.S. Supreme Court's decision to overturn Roe v. Wade, the pond featured pregnant Ken dolls holding signs that read, "Things Would Be Different IF ...." Another display, which attracted over 50,000 views on Instagram, depicted nine female justices of the Supreme Court with the hashtag "#Goals." In April 2020, during the COVID-19 pandemic in Washington, D.C., the pond featured Barbie dolls in boxing gloves fighting COVID-19. Another display celebrated the 2020 United States presidential election, with Barbies resembling U.S. president Joe Biden and vice president Kamala Harris surrounded by signs reading "I Voted." The curators have used the pond as a platform to raise awareness and funds for various causes, including Ukrainian refugees.

Despite its whimsical nature, the Barbie Pond has been described as "an oasis of mysteries" due to the curator's desire to remain anonymous. The Barbie Pond has gained popularity among locals and visitors, with over 7,000 followers on its Instagram account as of 2017. Some reviewers have praised the installation for bringing joy and creativity to the neighborhood. The Barbie Pond has become more than just a local curiosity. It serves as a creative commentary on cultural and political issues, often blending humor with social critique. Its Instagram account has amassed over 30,000 followers by 2023, and people from across the U.S. and even internationally have made it a point to visit the site.
