= Lists of advertising characters =

See one of the following pages:

- List of American advertising characters
- List of European advertising characters
- List of Australian and New Zealand advertising characters
- List of breakfast cereal advertising characters
