= Cookie Bear =

The term Cookie Bear refers to two distinct fictional bears:

- Cookie Bear was a comedy character (actually Janos Prohaska, a man in a bear suit) that appeared in zany sketches between the songs in The Andy Williams Show.
- Cookie Bear (New Zealand) was a character developed for advertising New Zealand company Cadbury Schweppes Hudson's biscuits.
