= List of European advertising characters =

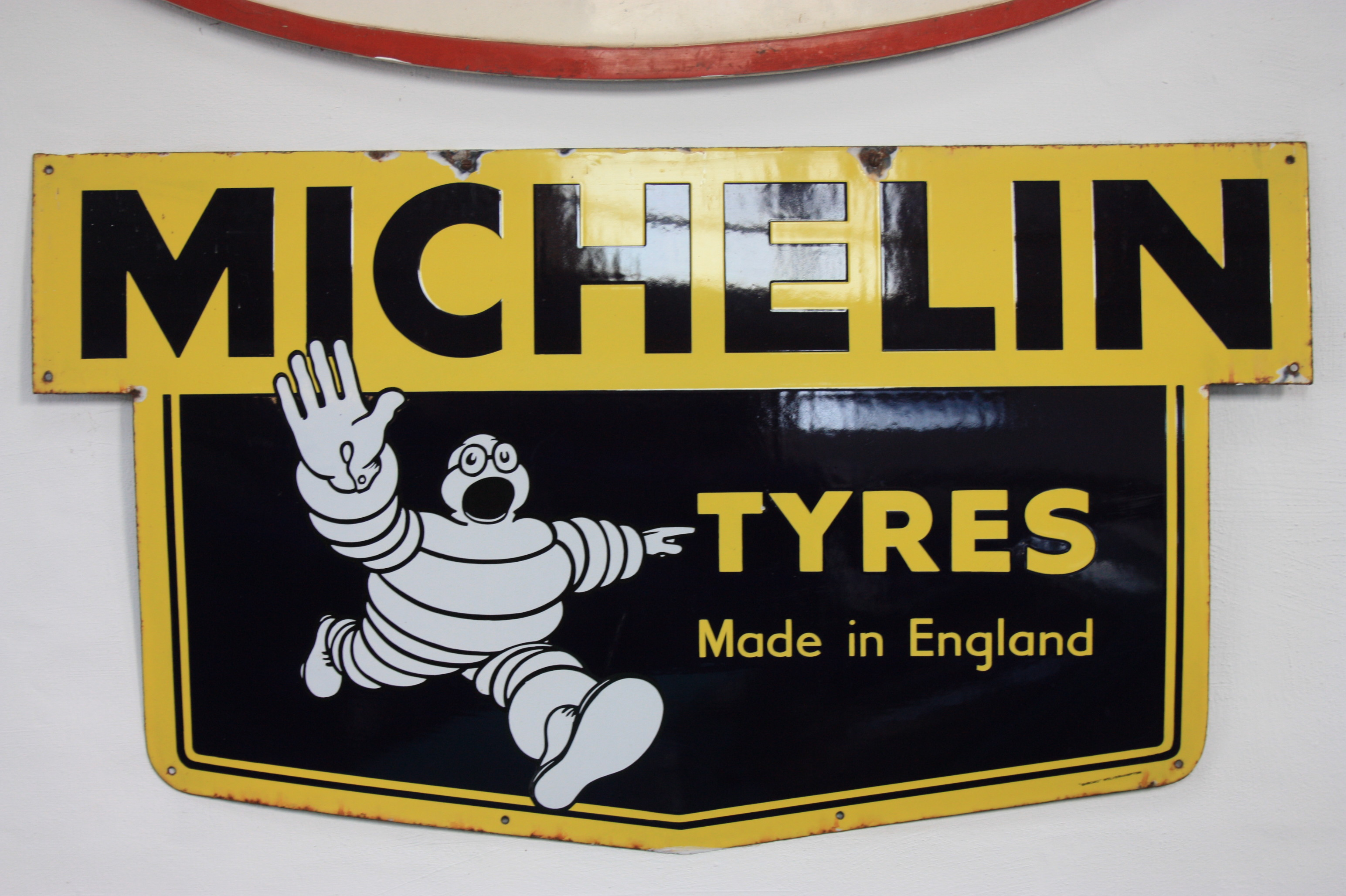
The Michelin Man – Bibendum

This is a list of notable mascots and characters created specifically for advertising purposes, listed alphabetically by the product they represent.

== The list ==
Company	Character(s)	Years used	Notes
Birds Eye	Captain Birdseye	1967–present	
British American Tobacco	Bruno (HB-Männchen)	1958-1972	Used in Germany to advertise for the cigarette brand HB. The choleric little man that literally blew up in the air when in anger and was cooled down when smoking a HB cigarette, is considered one of the most popular mascots in German advertising history.
Cadbury	Cadbury Caramel Bunny	1980s	
Carrefour Poland	Kerfuś	2022–present	
Churchill	Churchill	1996–present	Voiced by Bob Mortimer and partners Vic Reeves in adverts.
Cillit Bang	Barry Scott	2007–2016	Has been replaced by a mechanic dancing to a remix of "she's a maniac" from Flashdance.
Compare the Market	Aleksandr Orlov	January 2009–present	Voiced by Simon Greenall
Confused.com	Cara Confused	2010–2013	
Confused.com	Brian the Robot	2013–2016	
Deutsche Telekom	Robert T-Online	1999-2003	Portrayed by Matthias Kostya, similar in appearance to the character Max Headroom
Direct Line	the Direct Line phone with wheels	1985–present	in 2009 the Direct Line phone with wheels was given a voice by Stephen Fry and got an accomplice in the form of the Direct Line mouse with wheels, voiced by Paul Merton
Dr. Oetker	Frau Renate	1954-1960s	Portrayed by Hannelore Cremer
Ergo Lebensversicherung	Herr Kaiser	1972–2009	Portrayed by Günter Geiermann (1972–1990), Franz Michael Schwarzmann (1990–1996) and Nick Wilder (1996–2009); Used as the queen's disguise in the comedy film 7 Dwarves – Men Alone in the Wood (2004); Has a cameo in a 2017 Check24 commercial
Ferrero	Mr. Bon	2011–present	Used in Germany to advertise for the product Kinder Schoko-Bons
Ferrero	Nocci	2023–present	Name derived from the Italian word for hazelnut, "nocciola"
Ferrero	Ole	2020–present	Used in Germany to advertise for the product Kinder Pingui
Gocompare.com	Gio Compario	2009–present	
Happy Eater	'Mr. Happy'	1973–1996	
Haribo	Goldbear	1960–present	
Iglo	Käpt'n Iglo	1985–present	German mascot of the brand
Little Chef	'Fat Charlie'	1960–present	
Lombard Direct	the Lombard Direct phone	1995–present	
Michelin	Bibendum (the Michelin Man)	1898–present	
Milka	Milka cow	1971–present	
Milkybar	Milky Bar kid	1961–1998, 2000–present	the Milky Bar Kid is now computer generated and not an actual child
Mr. OG	Krispy Kreme		
Nederlandse Zuivel Organisatie	Frau Antje	1961–present	Portrayed by Kitty Janssen (1961-1963), Emilie Bouwman (1963-1973, 1984-late 1980s), Ellen Soeters (1973-1984), Saskia Valencia (late 1980s-1998, Madeleen Driessen (1999-2011), Mendy Smits (2011-2014), Floor Schothorst (2014–2018), Nyncke Bergman (2018-2025) and Annemarijn Kool (2018-2021, 2025-))
Nescafé Gold Blend	The Gold Blend couple	1987–1996	an episodic romance revolving around coffee, which spawned a 1993 novelization. Also used in Taster's Choice ad campaigns in the United States.
Orange Polska	Serce and Rozum	2010–present	The characters were originally developed for Telekomunikacja Polska, which in 2012, become Orange Polska. Characters had appeared for the last time in television commercial in 2017, however they are still used by the company on its social media.
Oxo	the Oxo family	1983–1999	
118 118	the 118 118 men	2003–present	the 118 118 men became the 118 118 team in 2006 and was themed as an A team parody
Sheilas' Wheels	The Sheilas	2007–present	Played by Emma Robbins, Carly Romain and Cathi Ogden. The trio would later become a pop group after the commercials took off and continued to perform in this capacity during their live appearances
Tayto	Mr. Tayto	1954–Present	Irish crisp company
Tesco Stores Ltd	Tommy Tesco and Flynn the Frog	2011–Present	Tommy is voiced by Stephen Mulhern
Tetley	the Tetley Tea Folk	1973–2001, 2010–present	
Walkers	Dez, "The Number One Spice Girls Fan!"	2019	Forsakes himself (and embarrasses the entire United Kingdom on social media) for refusing to share his Walkers Crisp with the Spice Girls after winning a chance to tour with the act; his Mum shames him by leaving with the girls

== See also ==
- List of American advertising characters
- List of Australian and New Zealand advertising characters
- List of Japanese advertising characters
