= 1936 Bundaberg distillery fire =

Fire in Queensland, Australia

Coordinates: 24.8543°S 152.3665°E

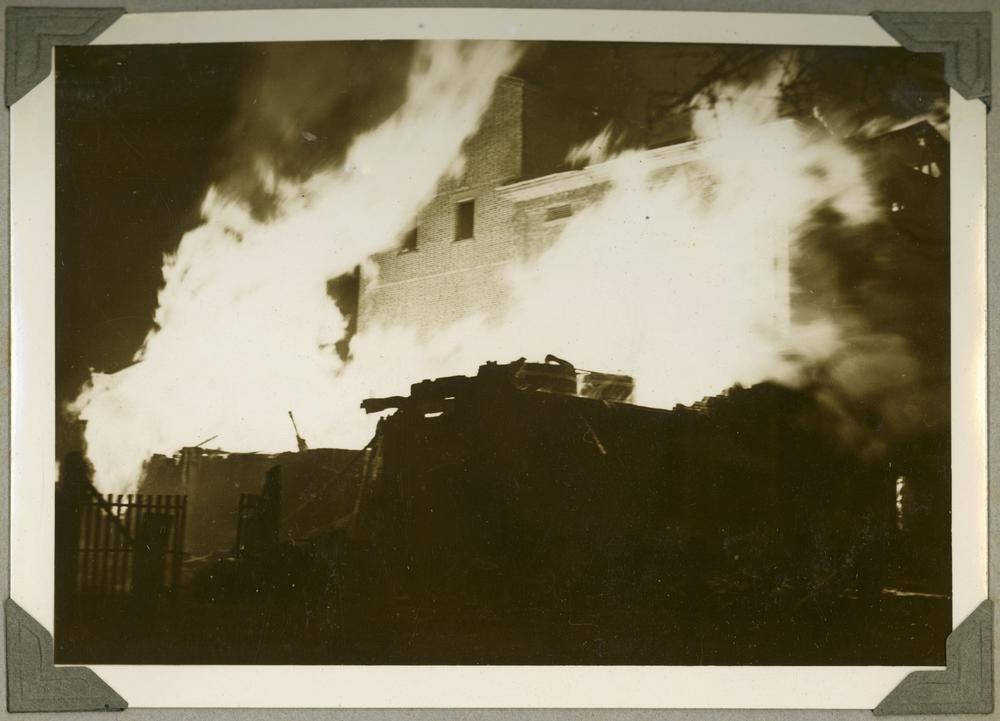
Fire raging at the Distillery, 1936

The 1936 Bundaberg distillery fire was a disaster in Bundaberg, Queensland, Australia.

== The fire ==
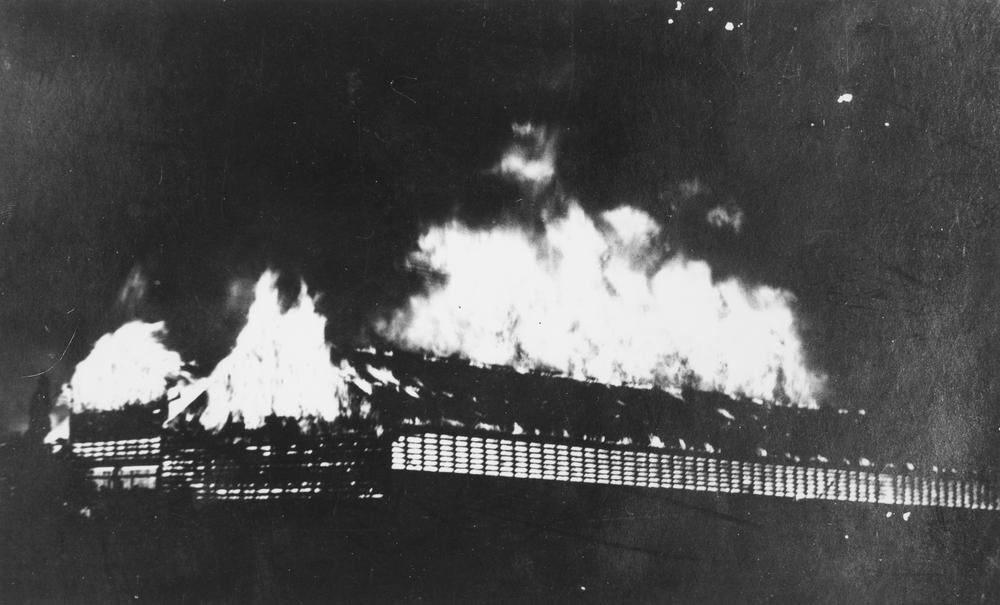
Distillery totally ablaze, 1936

In the early evening of 21 November 1936 the Bundaberg Rum Distillery was struck by lightning. The resulting explosion caused a raging inferno within minutes, as the contents of the rum vats fed the flames. There were 63 vats of rum and spirits each containing 10,000 gallons. This spectacular fire drew a large crowd of spectators and police cordoned off the area due to the intense heat. The glow from the flames could be seen as far away as Childers and Gin Gin. By midnight the flames were brought under control but the building itself was in ruins.

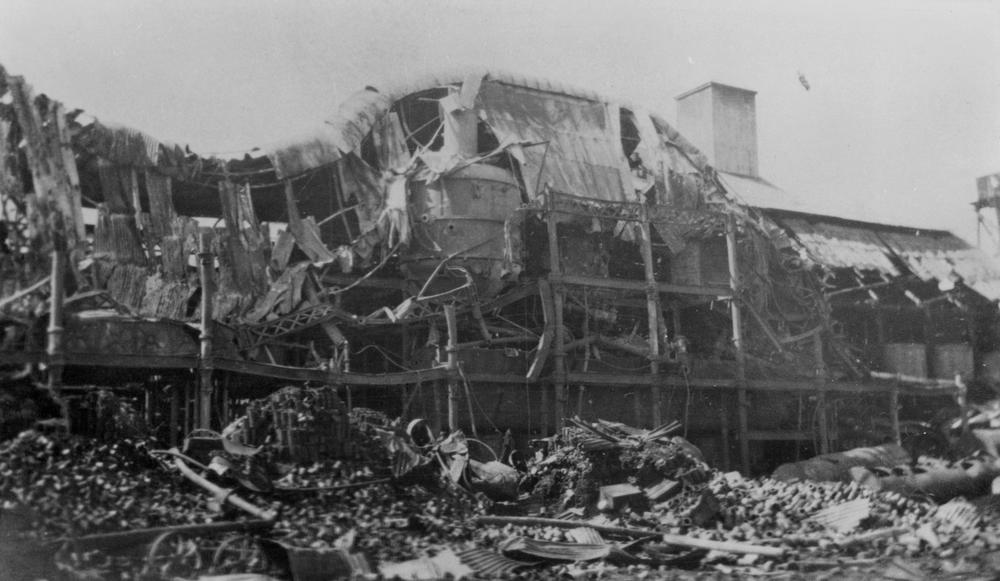
Distillery destroyed by fire, 1936

== The aftermath ==
The damage was estimated to have been approximately £200,000. No deaths or injuries were reported. The fire also had a devastating effect on the wildlife in the adjacent Burnett River with thousands of dead fish washed up on the river bank including sharks, cod, salmon and barramundi. The general manager of the distillery, which was owned by the Millaquin Sugar Company stated it was "one of the biggest fires in the history of the State".

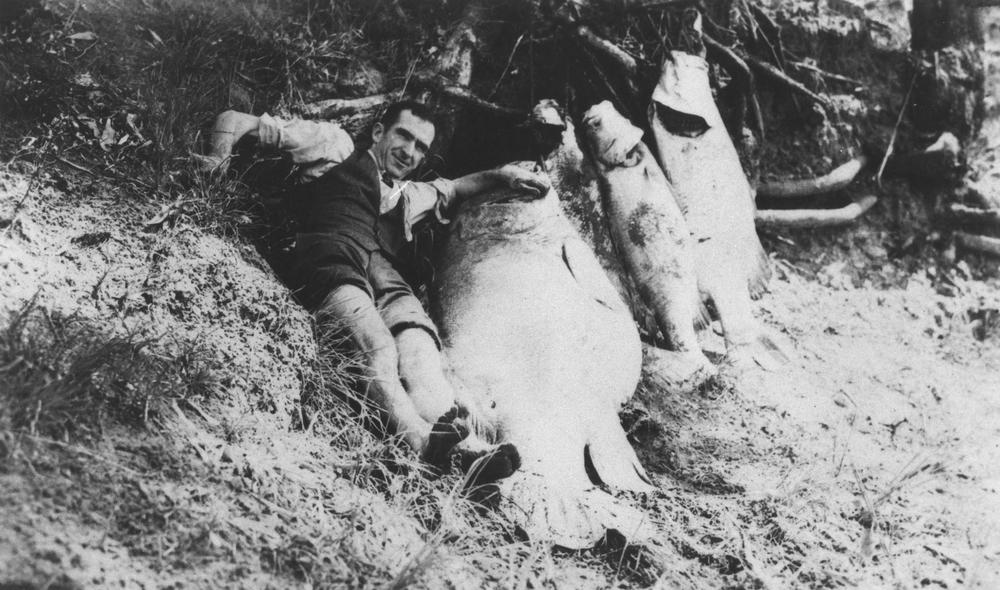
Fish killed by spillage in the Millaquin Distillery fire

== Recovery ==
Although it took three years the distillery was rebuilt and is currently operating on the same site today.

== Legacy ==
The State Library of Queensland holds some of the original correspondence and financial records for the Bundaberg Distilling Co. Ltd relating to the 1936 fire.

== See also ==
- History of Queensland
