= YoGo =

Australian dessert snack

- Type: Subsidiary
- Industry: Food & Beverage
- Headquarters: Docklands, Melbourne, Victoria, Australia
- Area served: Australia; New Zealand; Asia
- Products: Dairy
- Parent: Bega Dairy & Drinks

YoGo is an Australian yoghurt dessert snack made by Bega Dairy & Drinks. It comes in a yoghurt tub filled with chocolate custard. Its mascot is the YoGo Gorilla (voiced by Paul Johnstone), who mainly became popular from commercials throughout the 90s to the mid-2000s. There were calls in 2018 for the YoGo Gorilla to be removed from packaging in a push to reduce the promotion of unhealthy products to children.

== Brownes Dairy ==
In Western Australia, a similar yoghurt variant, 'Yogo' is produced by Brownes Dairy. Unlike the original YoGo, the advertising for Brownes variant revolved around a purple bird with the slogan Gimme Yogo!.

Brownes Yogo is sold in chocolate flavour, but previously also included Strawberry, Banana, and creamy rice, as well as chocolate variants "Dirt Dessert" and a "Double Decker" range with chocolate and a "marshmallow" top, or strawberry and a "marshmallow" top — all of which were discontinued in 2013.

Strawberry and Banana flavoured Yogo returned to sale on 5 July 2021. Yogo was first sold in the 1980s and 1990s under the Peters "Peters Farm" brand.

Yogo Dirt Dessert was rereleased in August 2024.
