= Mr Fourex =

Australian beer mascot

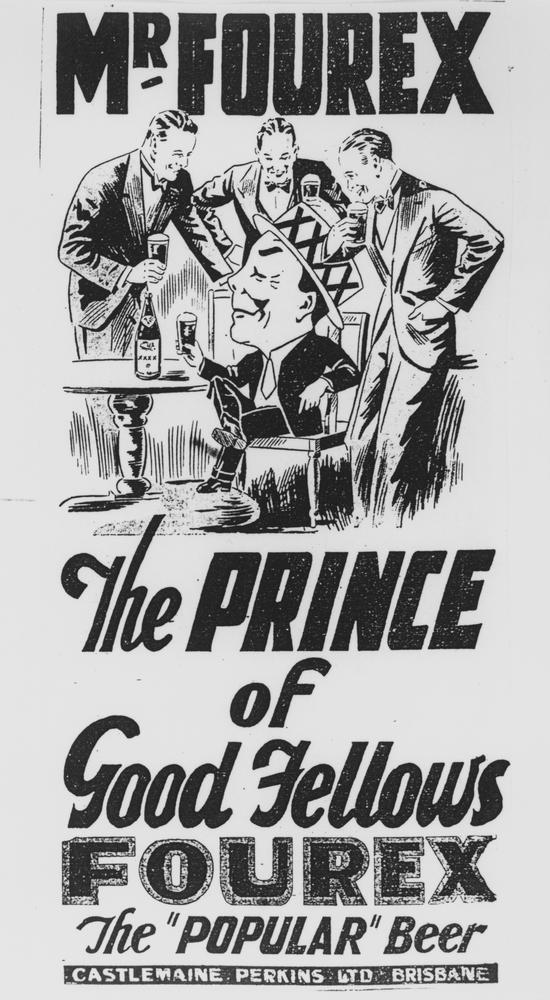
Mr Fourex in a 1920 advertisement

The Australian beer brand Castlemaine XXXX's mascot is Mr Fourex - a jovial cartoon man in a suit with a boater hat, who features on the City side of the Fourex Brewery at Milton, Queensland and has been used in advertising since 1924. He was the face of XXXX advertising campaigns until 1967 and afterwards remained featured on bottles and packaging. He was used for a billboard campaign in 2005, and a limited edition XXXX Gold can in 2019 as part of a "retro campaign".

The true identity for the inspiration behind the cartoon remains a mystery. Mr Fourex is sometimes said to be modelled after Paddy Fitzgerald, a former director of the company, however Mr Fourex had been conceived in 1924, and Fitzgerald started with XXXX only in circa 1933. A second theory is that the cartoon is modelled on a well-known dwarf who sold newspapers in the inner city suburb of Fortitude Valley in the late 1920s.

He was included in the 2004 List of Queensland Heritage Icons established by the National Trust of Queensland.

== See also ==
- List of Australian and New Zealand advertising characters
