= Bundy R. Bear =

A series of advertisements featuring the Bundaberg Rum bear, a polar bear known as Bundy R. Bear, was produced by advertising agency Leo Burnett to align the product 'with a larrikin approach to Australian mateship'. The Bundaberg Rum bear first appeared in 1961 and was created by Sam McMahon the brother of former Australian Prime Minister William McMahon. It was designed to soften rum's aggressive image and broaden its appeal from the traditional older male drinker to a more sociable audience.

The advertisements have been cited as a favourite among Australia's youth. Bundaberg Rum has also been criticised for targeting its advertising towards young people and boys, through television commercials during NRL broadcasts, and other promotions.

== See also ==
- List of Australian and New Zealand advertising characters
