= Orange Guy =

New Zealand mascot used to encourage voting

- Orange Guy and Pup as depicted during the 2026 New Zealand general election
- First appearance: 2009
- Created by: Electoral Commission

Orange Guy (Māori: Tangata Karaka) is a mascot used by New Zealand's Electoral Commission to encourage people to vote in elections. The character was introduced in 2009 and has been described by Newshub as 'iconic'. He features in advertising on television, radio, newspapers, social media, outdoors, and previously on 'I voted' stickers. Orange Guy has fingerless hands, chunky feet, square eyes, and a dog named Pup.

== History ==
Orange Guy was introduced by New Zealand's Electoral Commission in 2009. He changed into a dress shape in 2011 to celebrate Suffrage Day; the dress was made out of his flesh rather than clothes, which was described by Gabi Lardies of The Spinoff as "absolutely cursed". In 2020, Orange Guy was given a new companion, a dog named Pup. The Electoral Commission said that the dog cost about $13,000, and was modelled after a Jack Russell and a Dachshund.

David Correos voiced Orange Guy in the 2017 and 2020 general elections, as well as the 2019 local elections. He had previously been voiced by John Leigh. In 2017, American comedian Paul F. Tompkins described Orange Guy on Twitter as "a weird citrus golem of a voting mascot", which prompted Jemaine Clement to reply with "You have a weird citrus golem as a president".

In 2016, an Invercargill City Council candidate was asked by the Electoral Commission to remove Orange Guy from her Facebook page after she had added it. Orange Guy is trademarked by the Electoral Commission.

During the 2020 New Zealand general election, stickers saying "I voted" with Orange Guy were not given out after voting due to fears of spreading COVID-19. However, in the 2023 New Zealand general election they were discontinued. The discontinuation announcement was made by the Electoral Commission as a reply to a question on Twitter. Newshub described the merchandise as 'iconic' and that "the public has been left disappointed by the stickers' shock absence". The Electoral Commission said that they were discontinued because not enough people wanted the stickers after voting. Voters were instead given the option to use GIFs in place of the physical stickers. Some overseas voters got spare stickers with old branding from previous elections. These included former Prime Minister Jacinda Ardern who voted in New York and posted her stickers on social media.

In the lead up to the 2026 New Zealand general election, Orange Guy and Pup were given a new appearance and were placed in real-world locations, rather than ones made by CGI.

== Reception ==
In 2017, communication design senior lecturer Karol Wilczynska of Auckland University of Technology said that "It needs to not be fake, which is what Orange Guy is. It is a non-person and that does not work. The Orange Guy, as you call it, is a generic animated image that has no real connection to the population."

== See also ==
- Ulster County "I Voted" sticker – another remarkable electoral participation figure
