= Ulster County "I Voted" sticker =

Sticker from Ulster County, New York, US

- Artist: Hudson Rowan
- Year: 2022

The Ulster County "I Voted" sticker was designed in 2022 by 14-year-old Hudson Rowan as an entrant in the second annual youth design competition for "I Voted" stickers, held in Ulster County, New York, United States. The design went viral on social media and was picked up by radio stations as well as local and major media outlets. It won the final vote with over 228,000 votes, and was used by the county as their "I Voted" sticker during Election Day.

The sticker design was credited with encouraging voter participation, and two New York-based politicians had the design tattooed on themselves. On October 18, 2022, Rowan received the Pride of Ulster County Award for the design.

== Background ==
In 2022, Ulster County, New York, held its second annual youth design competition for "I Voted" stickers. The first design submitted in the competition was from 14-year-old Hudson Rowan of Marbletown through email, described by The Guardian as "a skull-like head with bloodshot eyes and multicolored teeth sitting atop turquoise spider legs." On the morning of April 20, election commissioner Ashley Dittus saw Rowan's submission and shared it with her colleagues; the board passed the design on to be included in the final contest to be held for public voting through their website, which was additionally open to non-residents. The winning design was to be used as official "I Voted" stickers for the county during early voting on October 29, and on Election Day on November 8.

== Vote and popularity ==
Voting began in July and was held through the month, with a scheduled ending date on July 29. Rowan's design, which was competing against five other finalist designs, quickly went viral on social media including TikTok and Twitter, and started receiving thousands of votes internationally. His design, substantially frontrunning the contest, began catching media attention. Before the afternoon of July 7, both the Times Herald-Record as well as WAMC recorded Rowan's design having around 37,000 votes, or 94% of the total count. That same day, Mashable recorded the design having over 51,000 votes. On July 8, WPDH recorded 55.5 thousand out of 58.7 thousand total votes. Later that day, WTXF-TV recorded Rowan's design having over 130,000 votes, which was more than Ulster County's largest voter turnout in history during the 2020 election. On July 12, The New York Times recorded over 158,500 out of 169,500 votes. On July 15, Teen Vogue recorded 195,100 votes out of 208,000 in total, surpassing the total population of Ulster County.

Rowan's design won by a landslide by the end of the contest, receiving over 228,000 out of 243,000 total votes, or just under 94% of the vote.
