= Cookie Bear (New Zealand) =

Toy of the New Zealand Cookie Bear

Cookie Bear is a familiar character in New Zealand originally associated with Hudsons and later Griffin's biscuits. Cookie Bear's popularity grew with New Zealand children through the Cookie Bear Club, their shared love of Chocolate Chippies brand biscuits and his famous catchphrase "Dum-de-doo".

== History ==
The New Zealand biscuit company Hudsons was bought by Cadbury in the 1930s. In the early 1970s Don Donovan, a director of advertising agency Carlton-Carruthers du Chateau Ltd., suggested developing the Cookie Bear character for a couple of television advertisements. The black and white advertisements featured Cookie Bear (a man dressed in a bear suit) as a lover of biscuits who thought Hudsons brand was the best.

Cookie Bear's immediate popularity resulted in an increase in his use as a mascot for Hudson's biscuits, with eventual heavy use of his image in advertisements, on packaging and on a growing number of promotional items. Cookie Bear became particularly associated with Chocolate Chippies, a hard round biscuit with chocolate chips. At the height of Cookie Bear's popularity in 1975, John Berry wrote and published an illustrated children's book called The Adventures of Cookie Bear.

When Hudsons was incorporated into Griffin's Foods (Hudsons' main market rivals) in 1989, the copyright for Cookie Bear was also transferred; however, while Griffin's continues to use the Cookie Bear character on some of its products and in a few advertisements, Cookie Bear is now a less familiar New Zealand cultural icon.

== Cookie Bear Club ==
Cookie Bear's fame and popularity escalated through the Cookie Bear Club, which had a regular monthly page in the New Zealand Woman's Weekly magazine. Children throughout New Zealand joined the club, reaching a peak of 180,000 children, or 1 in 4 New Zealand children under the age of 12. Members of the club received postcards on their birthday. The Cookie Bear Club eventually moved online to the official Cookie Bear Club website.

== See also ==
- List of Australian and New Zealand advertising characters
