= I Voted sticker =

Sticker given to voters in the United States

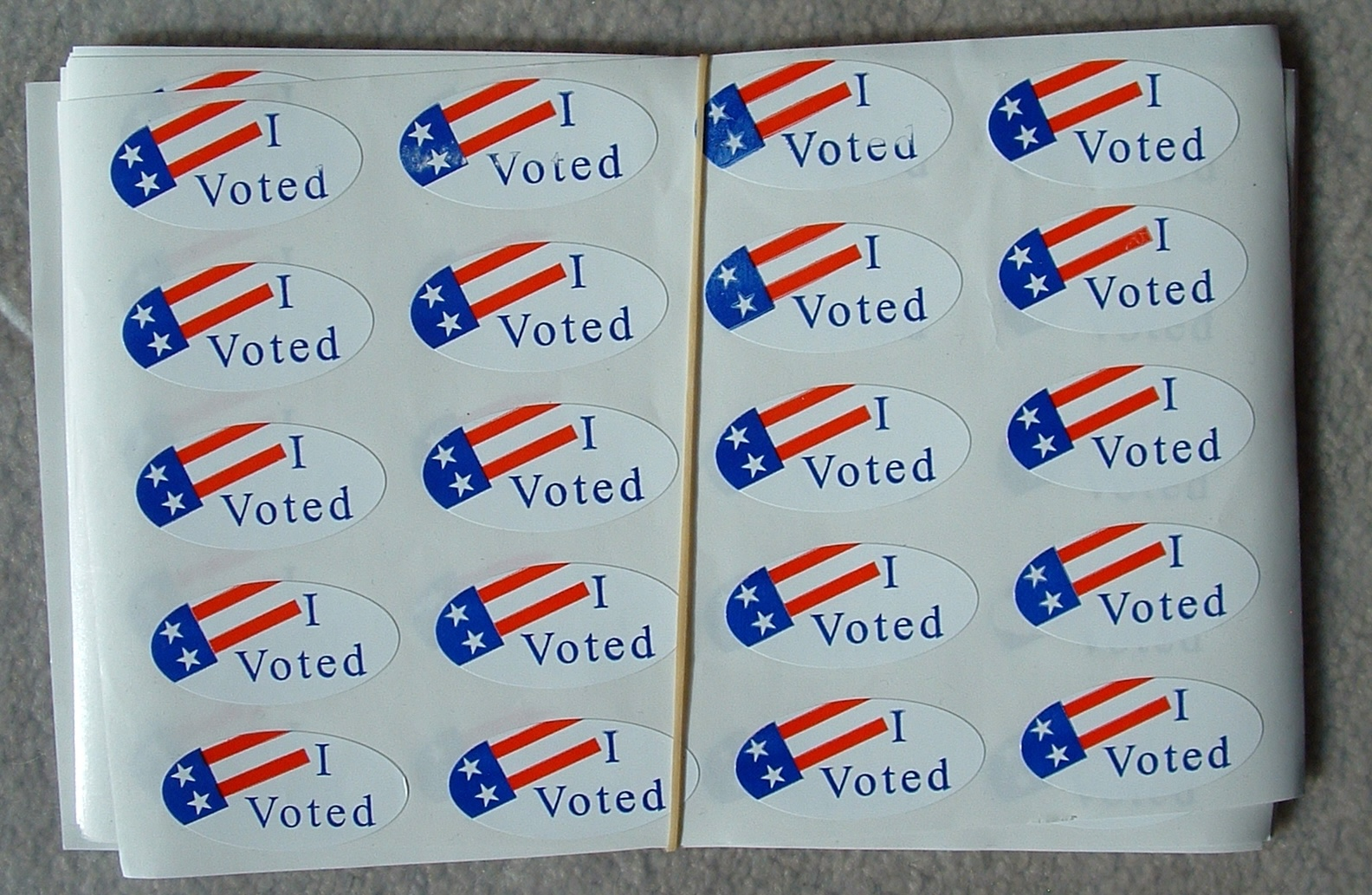
A sheet of "I Voted" stickers in Alameda County, California, 2006

An "I Voted" sticker is given to voters in the United States. Popular nationally since the 1980s, the stickers often feature the text "I Voted" in English or other local languages, with many featuring the United States flag and other patriotic themes.

State and local governments, which manage elections in the United States, purchase generic "I Voted" stickers from suppliers, or design their own. One common design, distributed nationally since 1987 by a North Carolina supplier, is a small white oval featuring a stylized image of a waving American flag.

== History ==
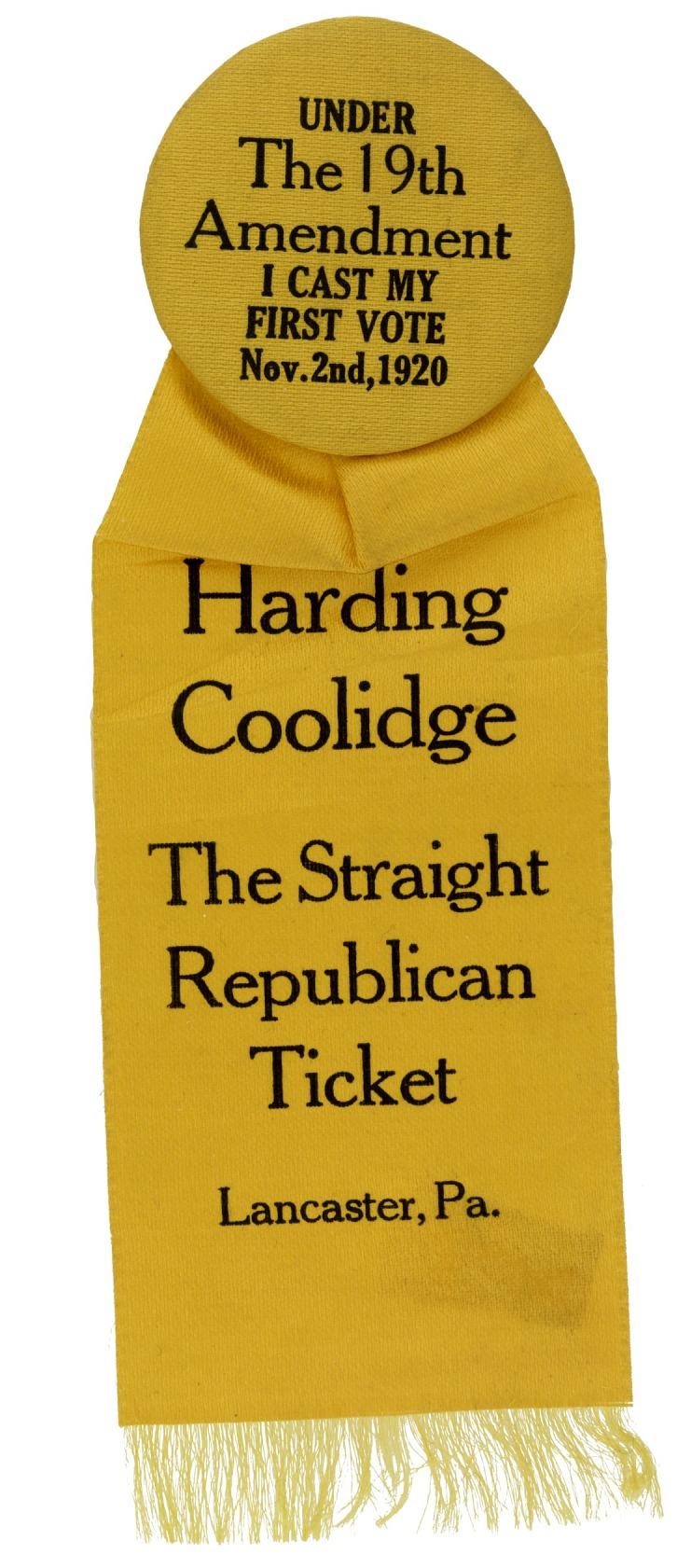
1920 button celebrating women's suffrage, cited by the National Museum of American History as an early predecessor to the "I Voted" sticker

An early predecessor to the "I Voted" sticker is Election Day-related memorabilia in general, such as buttons, pins, and pieces of clothing. The first such item in the collection of the National Museum of American History is an Election Day button from 1920, distributed by the Republican Party in Lancaster, Pennsylvania. The button commemorates the beginning of women's suffrage in the United States, and reads "Under the 19th Amendment I Cast My First Vote, Nov. 2nd, 1920." A 1950 article from the Miami Herald mentions an "I Have Voted" sticker, and voting-themed clothing and paraphernalia flourished following the passage of the 26th Amendment in 1971.

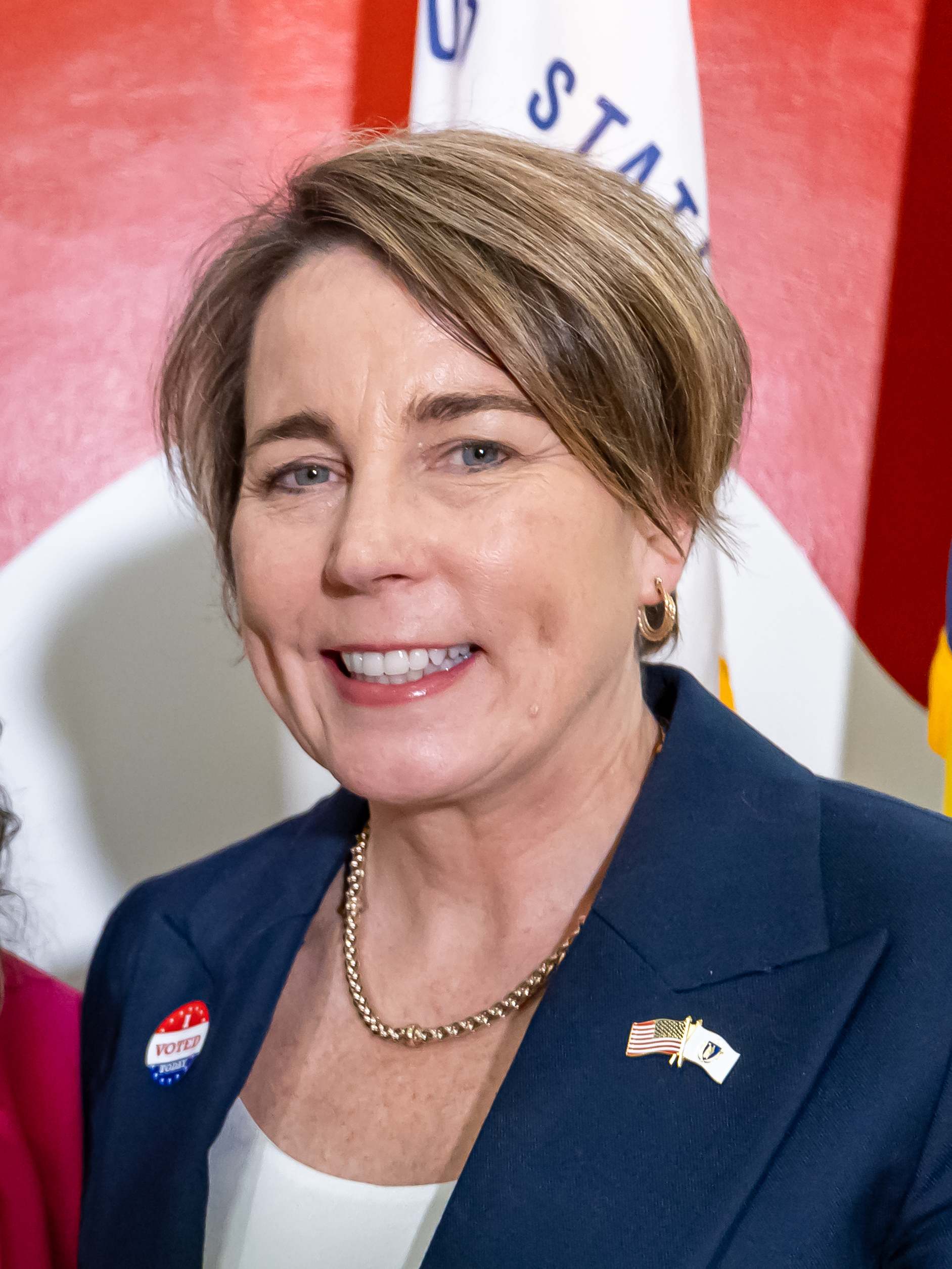
Maura Healey, Mass. Governor

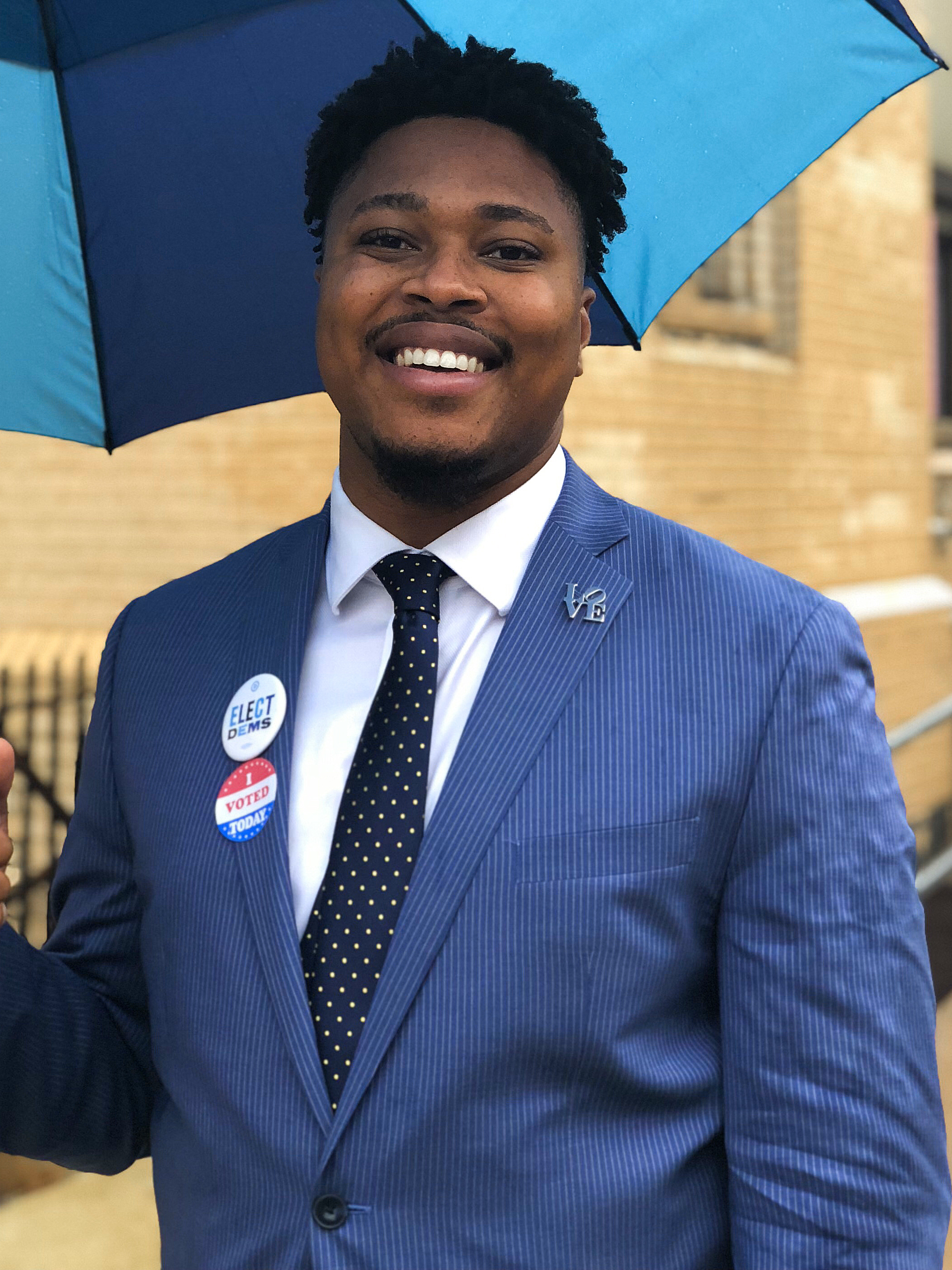
Malcolm Kenyatta, Pa. State Rep.

Politicians wearing "I Voted" stickers

In the 1980s, multiple entities began creating and distributing "I Voted" stickers, and their popularity rose greatly. A realtors association in Phoenix began printing "I Voted" stickers in 1985, and Florida-based National Campaign Supply claims to have started selling them in 1986.

Independent Tabulation Corp. of Morrisville, North Carolina introduced an "I Voted" sticker design in 1987, which featured a stylized American flag. Company president Janet Boudreau designed the sticker, which stood in contrast to other designs of the era that featured graphics of checkboxes and ballots. Independent Tabulation, since renamed Intab, still sells stickers of the original design as of 2024.

The National Museum of American History continues to collect "I Voted" stickers as part of its larger collection of election-related materials.

== Designs ==
The 1987 Intab design, created by company president Janet Boudreau, is still in production. It is a 1 3/4 by 7/8 inch (4.4 cm × 2.2 cm) white oval sticker, featuring an image of a waving American flag to the left of the text "I Voted" in blue serif font.

Locally-produced designs often feature regional landmarks, symbols, and languages. New York City designs have featured the Statue of Liberty, and Georgia designs often feature a peach. A Travis County, Texas design depicts a bluebonnet, Texas' state flower, forming a checkmark. The Alaska Division of Elections prints "I Voted" stickers with text in 10 languages: English, Spanish, Koyukon, Gwichʼin, Aleut, Tagalog, Alutiiq, Northern Iñupiaq, Nunivak Cupʼig, and Yup'ik.

"I Voted" Sticker from Palm Beach County during the 2026 Midterm Elections

Since the 2010s, "I Voted" sticker design contests have become popular, seeking submissions from grade school students or the general public. The Election Assistance Commission, an independent federal agency that coordinates and assists local election officials, promotes sticker design contests as a method of community engagement. The EAC's annual Clearinghouse Awards have featured a category for "Creative and Original 'I Voted' Stickers" since 2019.

Some "I Voted" sticker designs are more abstract. One such example is the 2022 Ulster County "I Voted" sticker, designed by 14-year-old artist Hudson Rowan for Ulster County, New York. The design was described by The Guardian as "a skull-like head with bloodshot eyes and multicolored teeth sitting atop turquoise spider legs" with the text "I Voted" "scribbled in graffiti-like font," and represented a departure from traditional themes of landmarks, symbols, and patriotism.

== Ritual significance ==
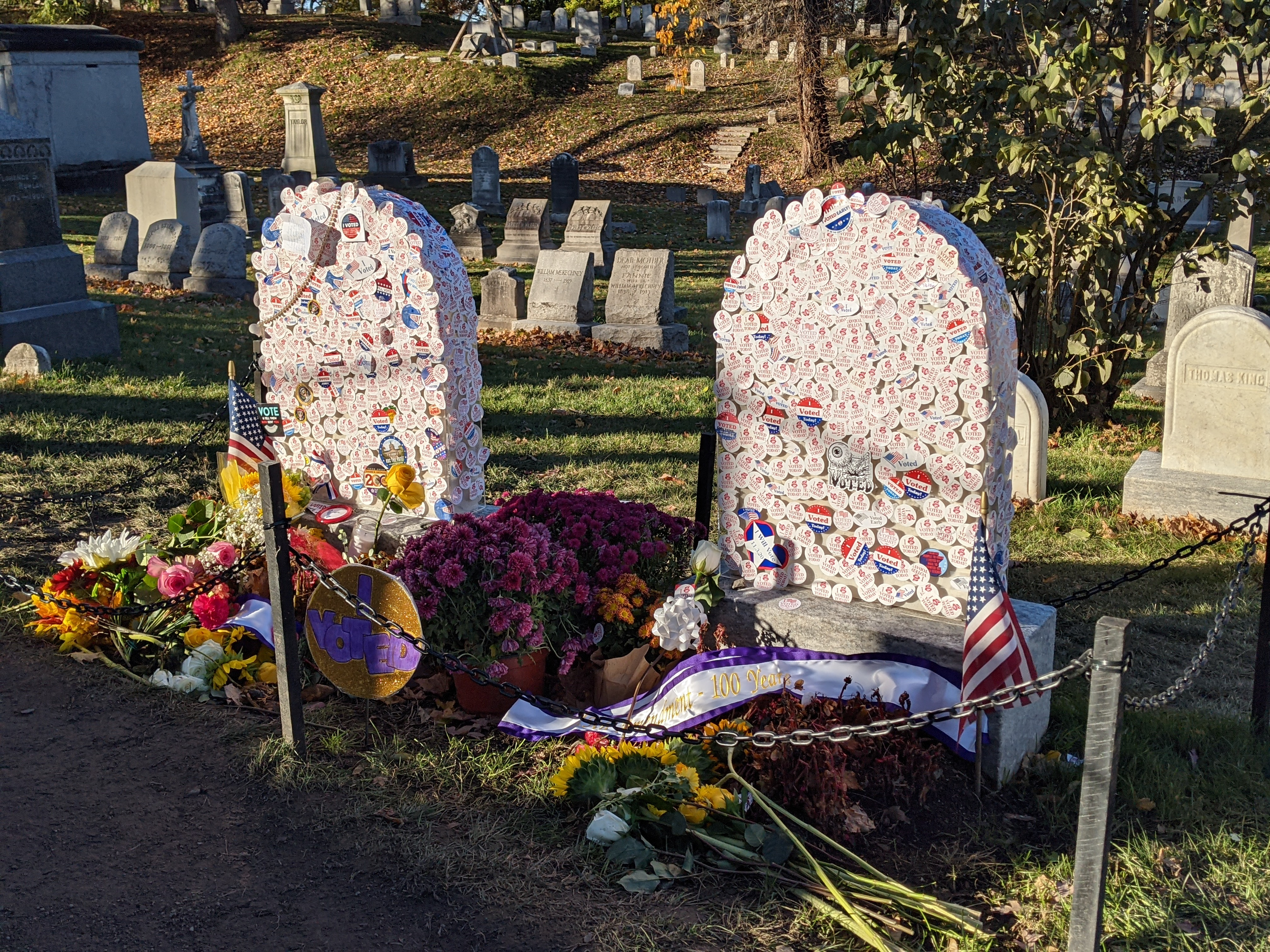
Gravestones of Susan B. and Mary Stafford Anthony with "I Voted" stickers

Religious studies scholar Jordan Conley analyzed the longstanding practice of placing "I Voted" stickers on the grave of Susan B. Anthony in a 2020 paper, which studied the 2016 presidential and 2018 midterm elections. Conley argues that the stickers at Anthony's grave constitute a form of votive offering, and compares them to votive offerings depicting body parts at ancient sanctuaries of the Greek god of medicine Asclepius. Conley highlights the dual-purpose nature of offerings to Asclepius, which she argues represent both an offering and a "means of recognizing affliction and enacting healing." This dual purpose, Conley argues, is analogous to the "I Voted" stickers on Anthony's grave in 2016, which "demonstrated a similarly dual focus as both devotional offerings but also markers of affliction and appeals for healing or restoration in the midst of an election season that was considered painfully regressive and irreparably divisive in so many ways."

Approximately 12,000 people visited Anthony's grave, located in Mount Hope Cemetery in Rochester, New York, on Election Day 2016. The practice of placing stickers on the grave grew so popular that it began to damage the marble headstone, which was covered with a plastic shield in October 2020 to protect it from further damage.

Social media researcher Chelsea Butkowski analyzed the ritual qualities of selfies on Election Day 2016 in a 2023 paper, and found that "I Voted" stickers formed an important component of the selfies and their ritual importance. Butkowski's study used a content analysis of Election Day selfies posted on Twitter with election-related hashtags, analyzing a sample of 2000 selfies identified from 3 million tweets. Over 80% of the studied selfies featured an "I Voted" sticker, appearing more frequently than polling place signage, ballots, or party affiliation.

== Gallery ==
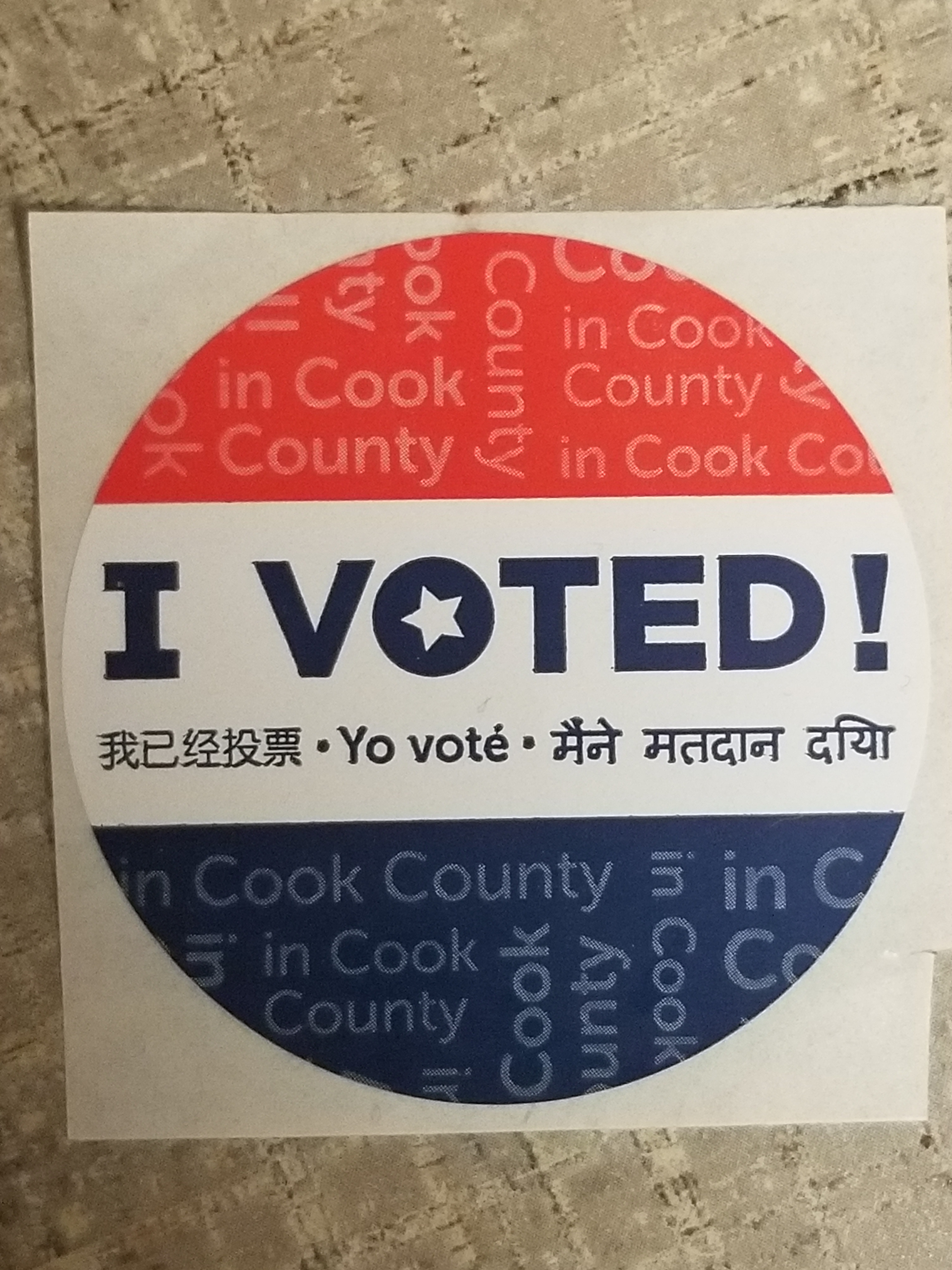
Cook County, Illinois, 2018

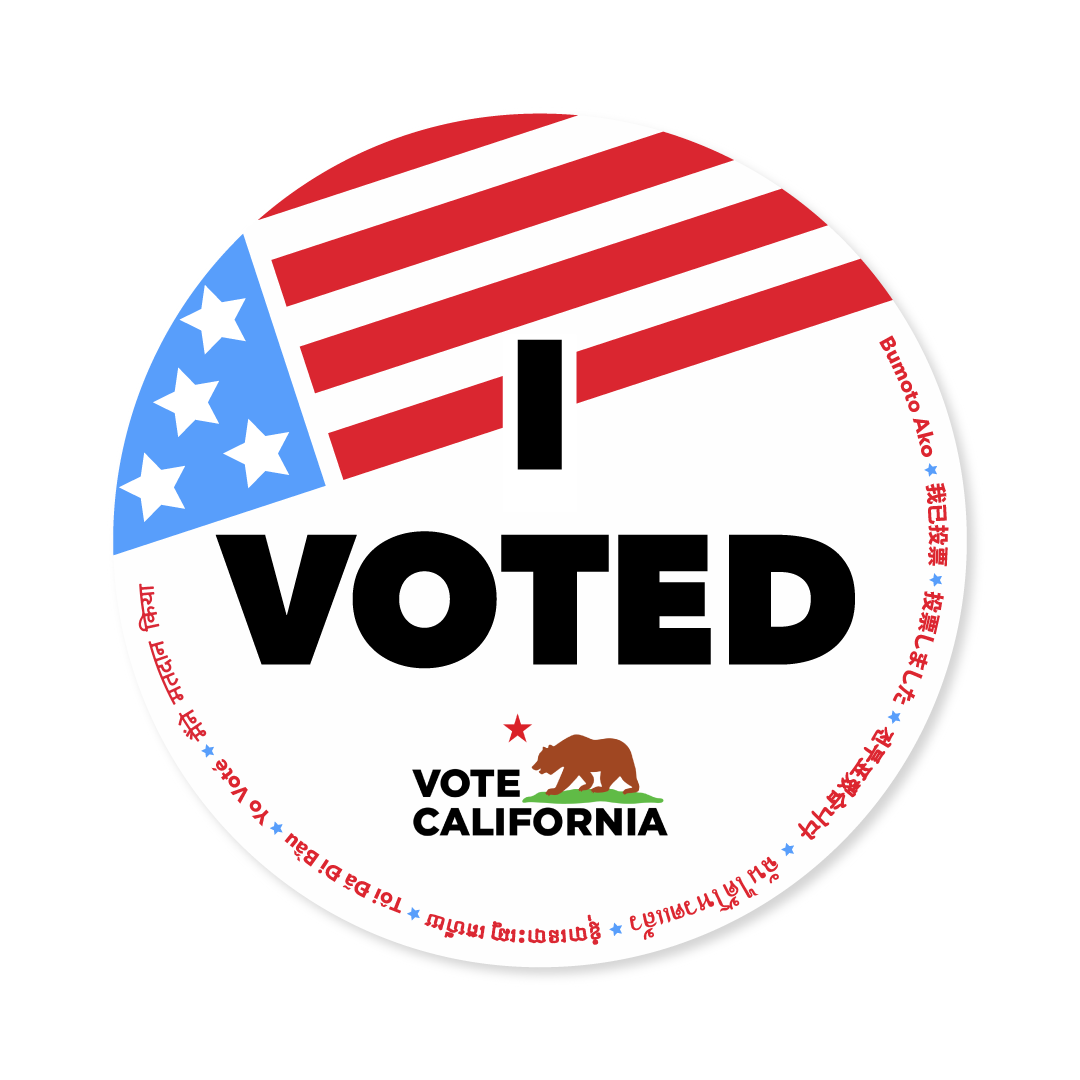
California, digital version, 2020

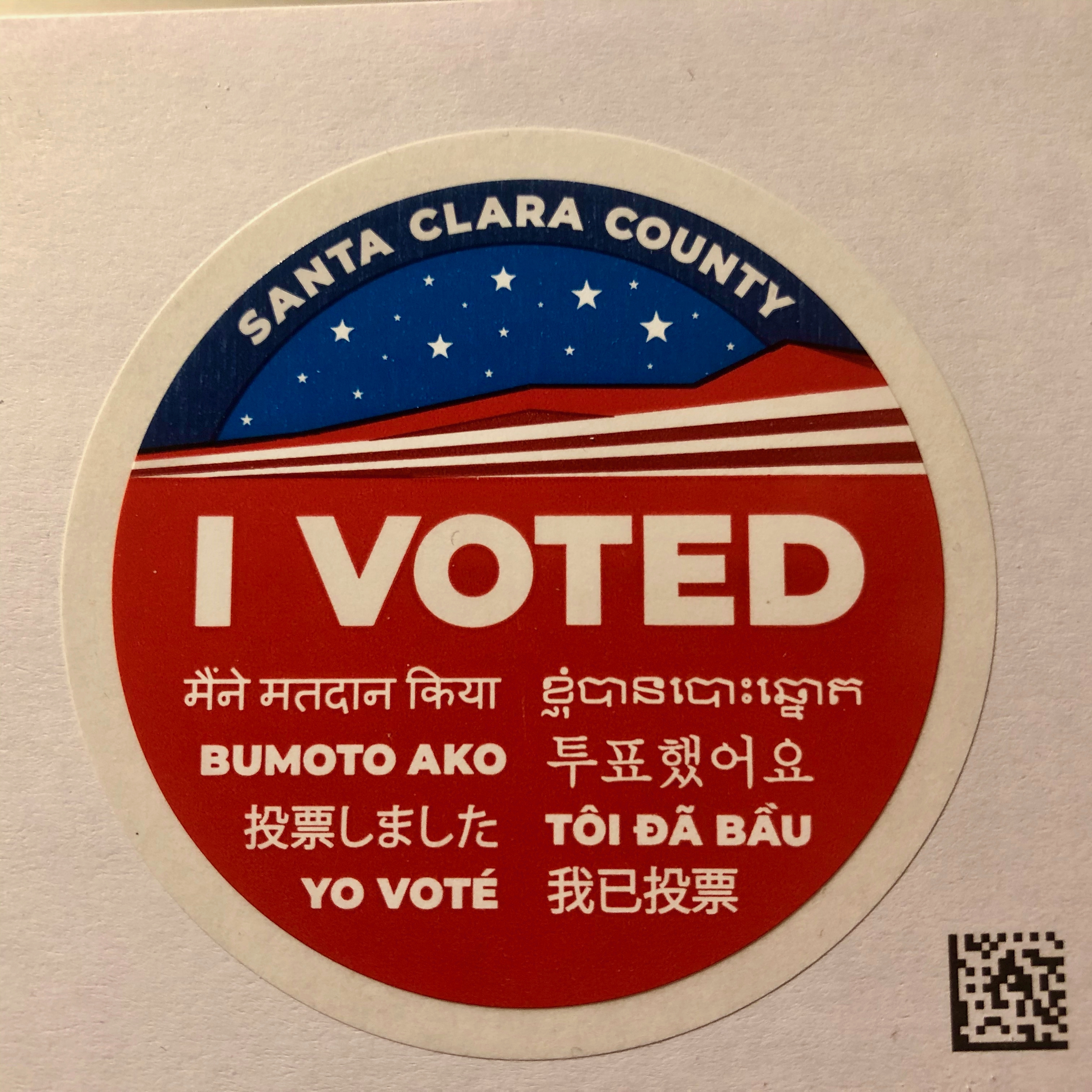
Santa Clara County, California, 2020

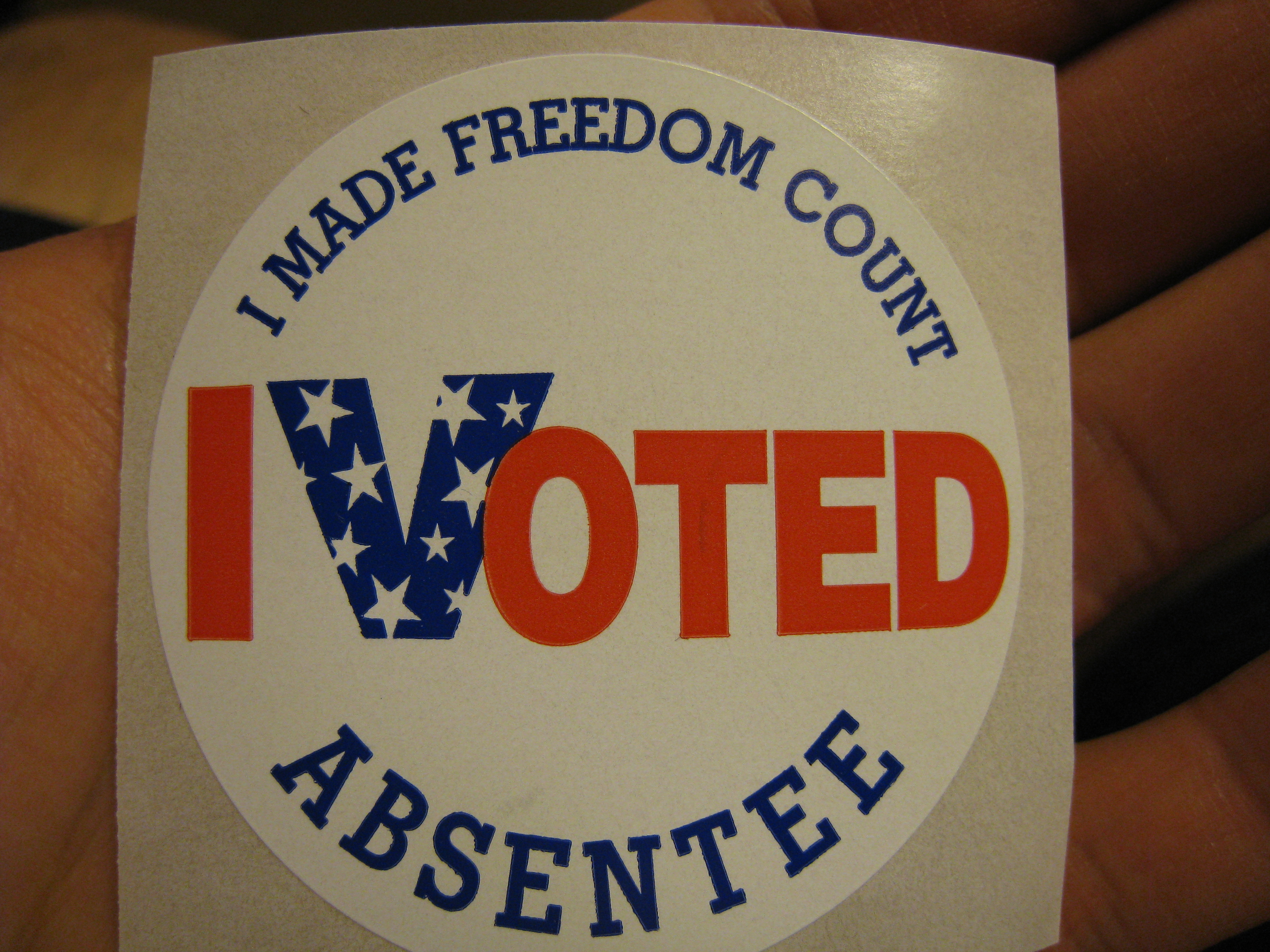
Virginia, absentee voting, 2008

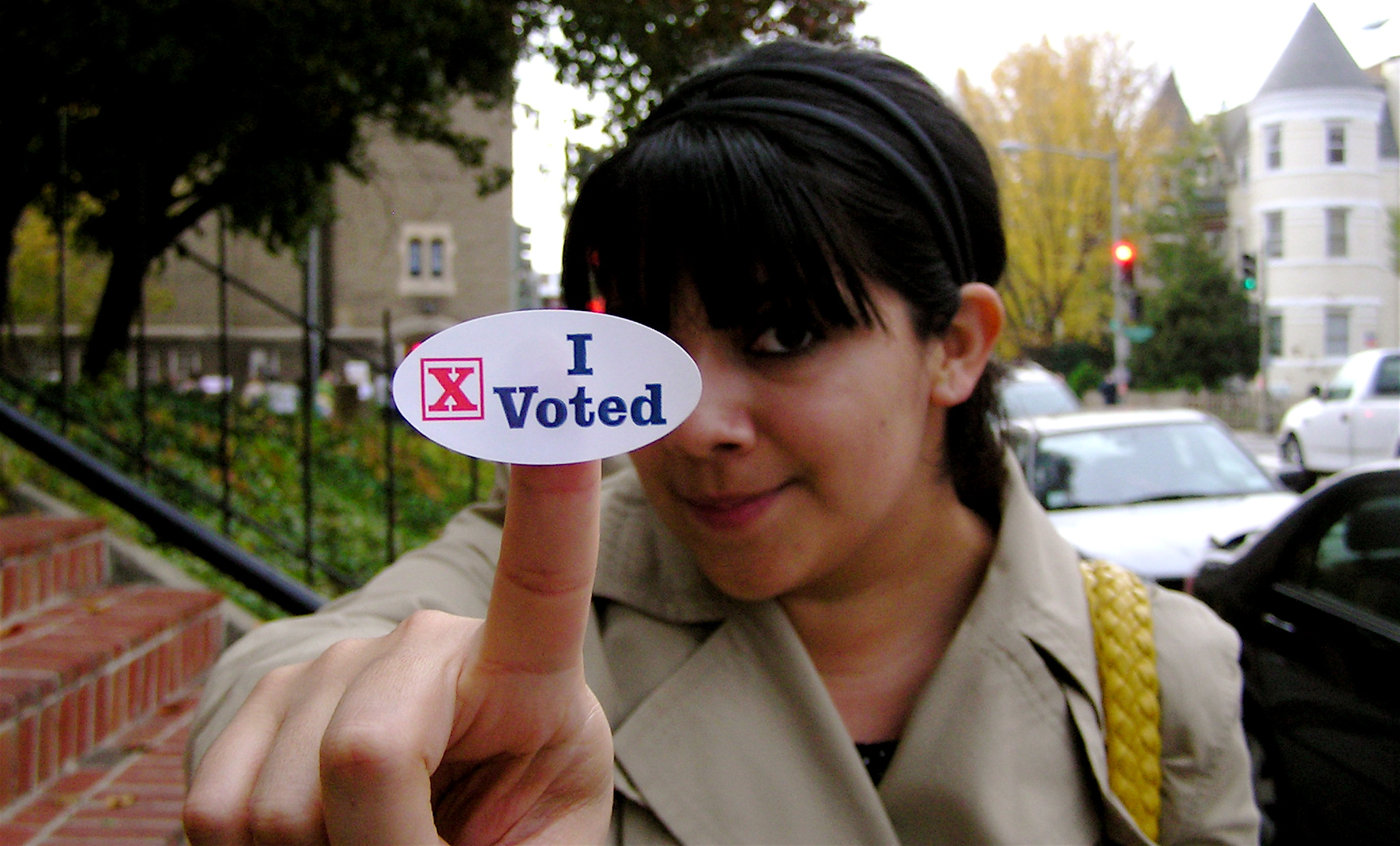
Washington, DC, 2008

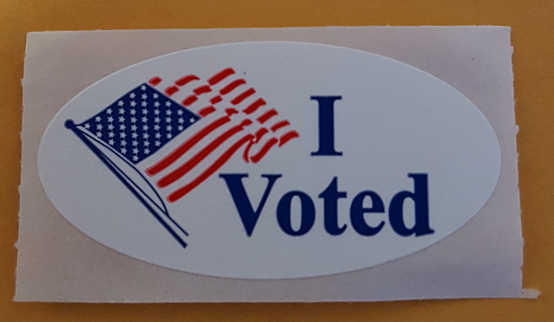
Boston, Massachusetts, 2016

Sioux Falls, South Dakota, 2026

== See also ==
- Campaign button – Election object worn as political advertising
- Election ink – Marker to prevent double voting
- Elections in the United States
