= Serce and Rozum =

Fictional characters and mascots for Orange Polska

- Serce i Rozum character
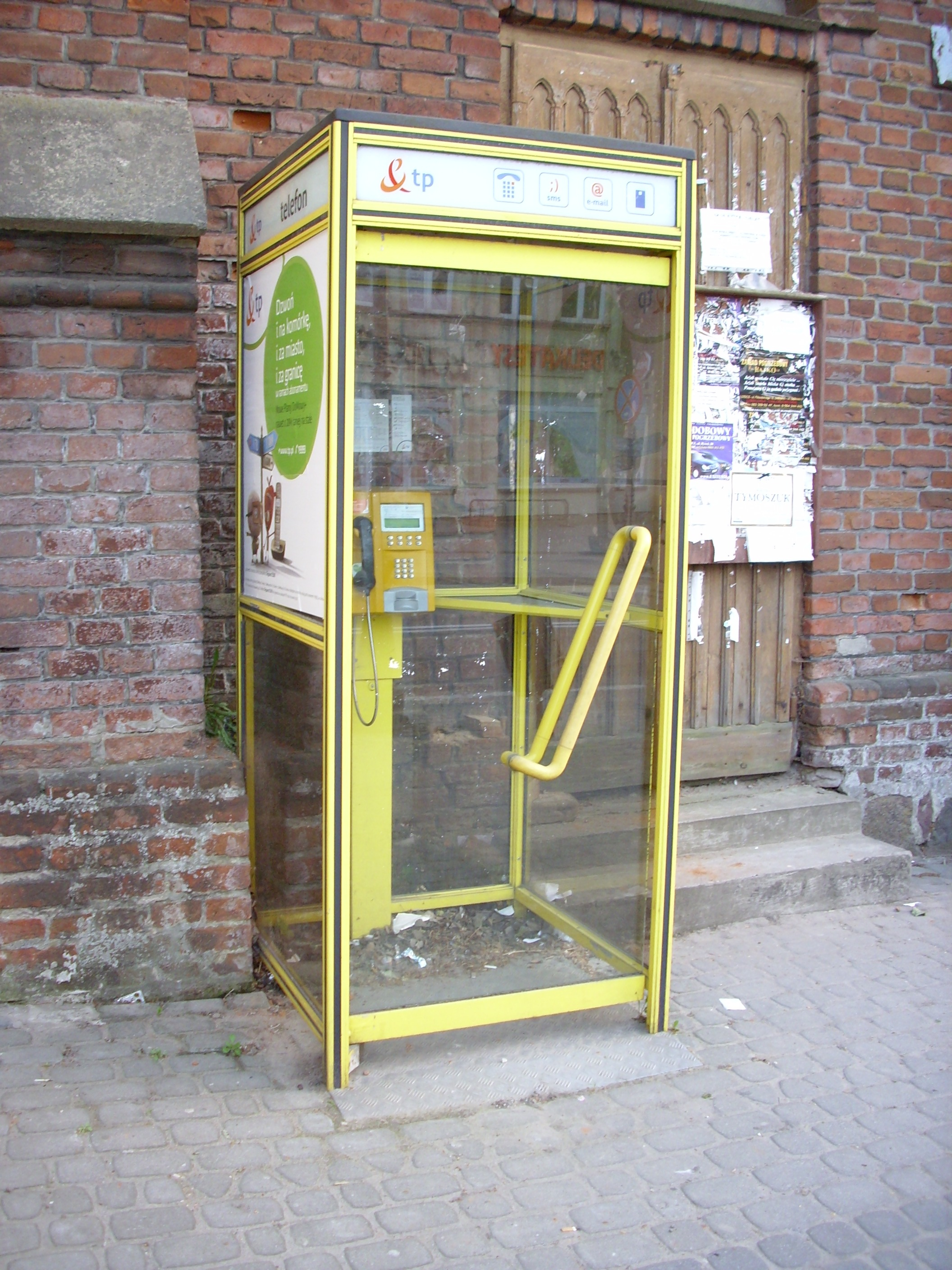
- The phonebooth, with Serce i Rozum commercial on its side.
- First appearance: 2010
- Last appearance: 2016 (in television commercials)
- Created by: Publicis
- Voiced by: Jarosław Boberek (Serce); Michał Sitarski (Rozum)

In-universe information
- Species: Stuffed toys
- Gender: Male

Serce (Note: from Polish: heart) and Rozum (Note: from Polish: mind, reason) are the official mascots of Orange Polska, a telecommunications provider in Poland. They appeared for the first time in a series of commercials in 2010, and since then have become one of the most successful advertising campaign in Poland. They were originally created by the Publicis advertising agency for Telekomunikacja Polska. They appeared in a television commercial for the last time in 2016. They continue to be present on their social media, such as on their Facebook page, which is the most followed Polish-language page on the website. They are talking stuffed toy roommates. Serce is an anthropomorphic heart acting on its emotions and Rozum is an anthropomorphic brain with glasses who guides himself with logic. Serce and Rozum are voiced by Jarosław Boberek and Michał Sitarski, respectively.

== History ==
The characters were developed by the Publicis advertising agency for Telekomunikacja Polska, a Polish telecommunications provider. The company commissioned them for their new advertising campaign, as they started facing emerging competition on the formerly monopolistic market. The characters were designed to reflect the duality of human nature: Serce acting on his emotions, while Rozum – on logic. As such, Serce was depicted as an anthropomorphic heart and Rozum as an anthropomorphic brain. The series of commercials depicting the characters premiered in 2010 on television and the internet and was meant to promote Telekomunikacja Polska's Neostrada, which was based on the digital subscriber line technology. The commercials quickly became a success, with characters becoming recognizable mascots of the company. For their campaign, Publicis was awarded a Grand Prix at 2011 Effie Awards Poland.

Serce was voiced by Jarosław Boberek, and Rozum by Michał Sitarski. The commercials were animated in 3D technique by two studios: Xantus, led by director Kuba Michalczuk and art director Piotr Gołąbek; and Human Ark, with Kamil Polak and Wojtek Wawszczyk overseeing a team of over fifteen.

The commercials were originally based around dialogue between Serce and Rozum, revealing their differing views on various matters. Eventually, the producers started introducing various episodic characters, some of which developed into secondary and recurring characters, such as Pieszczoch (Serce's pet), Rabbit, Renia the Reindeer, and the Eyes.

Simultaneously to their television debut appearance, Serce and Rozum appeared on the internet, with their social media being developed by Adv.pl (later renamed Lemon Sky) advertising company. In 3 months since their debut, their Facebook page gained 40 thousand followers, placing in the top 10 fasters growing Polish pages on Facebook. In 2012, the page become the most-followed Polish-language page on Facebook, with over 1.6 million followers.

On 31 December 2013, Telekomunikacja Polska merged with Polska Telefonia Komórkowa Centertel, becoming Orange Polska. As such, Orange inherited the mascots and continued running the commercials featuring them.

Serce and Rozum appeared in a television commercial for the last time in 2016. In 2017, Orange Polska announced that they won't be producing more commercials featuring those characters and that they will be developing a new advertising campaign instead. The company stated as the reason behind their cancellation the desire to expand into advertising a wider range of services, with Serce and Rozum being mostly associated with telecommunications, as well that their commercial campaign become old and overused. Nevertheless, Serce and Rozum continue to be active on their social media platforms, such as their Facebook page.
