= Bundaberg Rum =

Brand of rum

Coordinates: 24.854°S 152.367°E

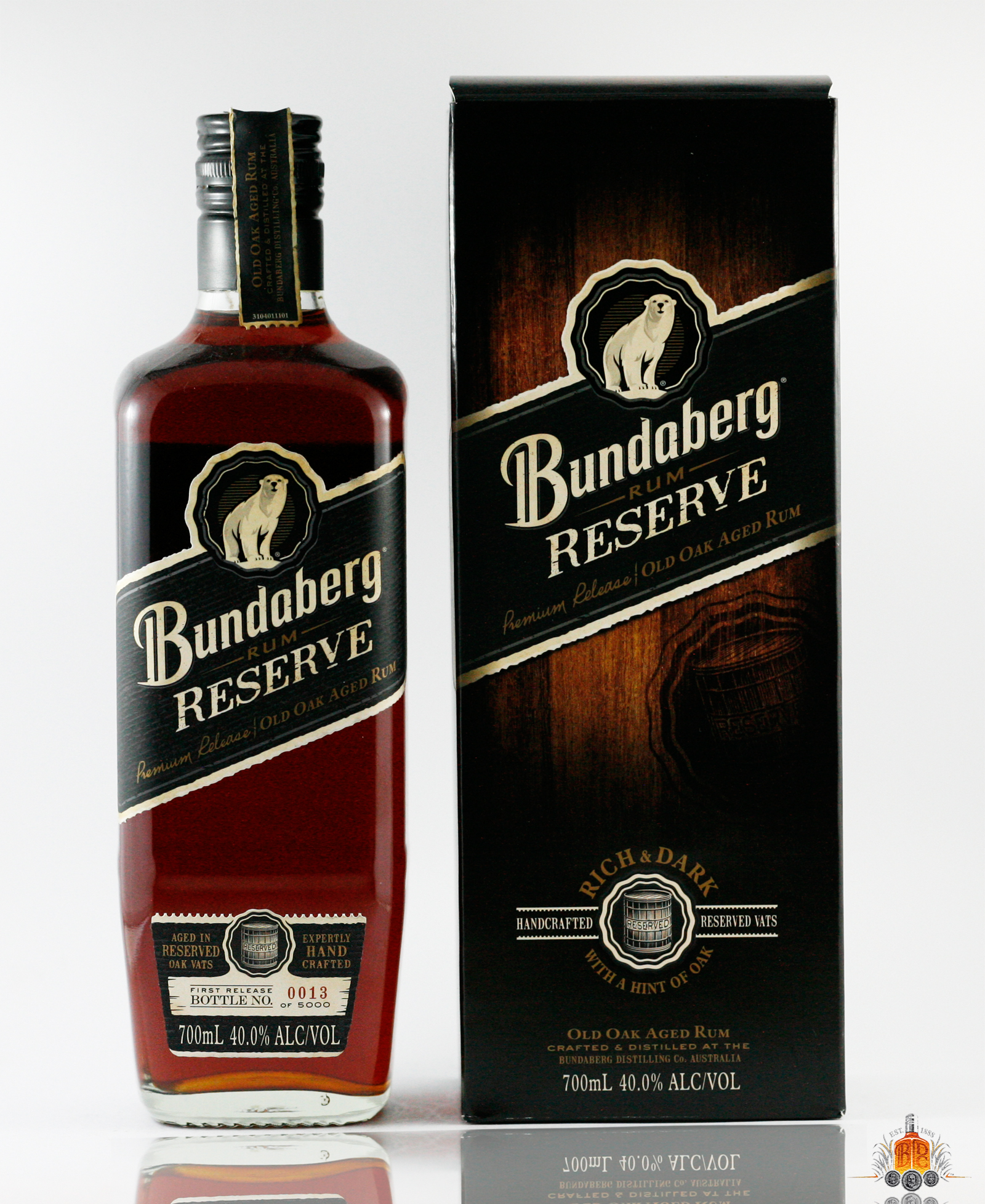
- Bundaberg Rum Reserve
- Manufacturer: Diageo
- Origin: Australia
- Introduced: 1888; 138 years ago
- Colour: Dark and White
- Website: http://www.bundabergrum.com.au

Bundaberg Rum, colloquially known as Bundy, is a dark rum owned by Diageo. It is produced in Bundaberg East, Queensland, Australia, by the Bundaberg Distilling Company. In 2010, the Bundaberg Distilling Company was inducted into the Queensland Business Leaders Hall of Fame.

== History ==
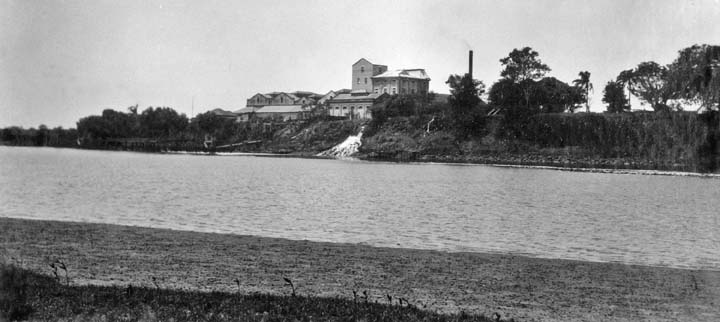
Bundaberg Rum Distillery, Burnett River, Bundaberg., Circa 1931.

Bundaberg Rum originated because the local sugar mills had a problem with what to do with the waste molasses after the sugar was extracted. Molasses was heavy and difficult to transport, and the costs of converting it to stock feed were rarely worth the effort. Sugar men first began to think of the profits that could be made from distilling. The key meeting was held at the Royal Hotel on 1 August 1885. W. M. C. Hickson served as the chairman, and other notables in attendance included all the big sugar mill owners of that time: W. G. Farquhar, F. L. Nott, T. Austin, J. Gale, S. McDougall, T. Penny, S. H. Bravo and A. H. Young. All became the first directors of the company, which started with a capital of £5,000 converted into $9,725.18.

The Bundaberg Distilling Company began its operations in 1888, and Bundaberg rum was first produced in 1889. Production ceased from 1907 to 1914, and from 1936 to 1939, after fires, the second of which caused rum from the factory to spill into the nearby Burnett River. Many fish were killed due to the liquor runoff into the river.

Christsen Pty Ltd operated their own Bundaberg Rum bottling plant in Bourbong Street, Bundaberg, at the rear of their large grocery and hardware business in the centre of town. The spirit was sold at UP and OP strength from their business.

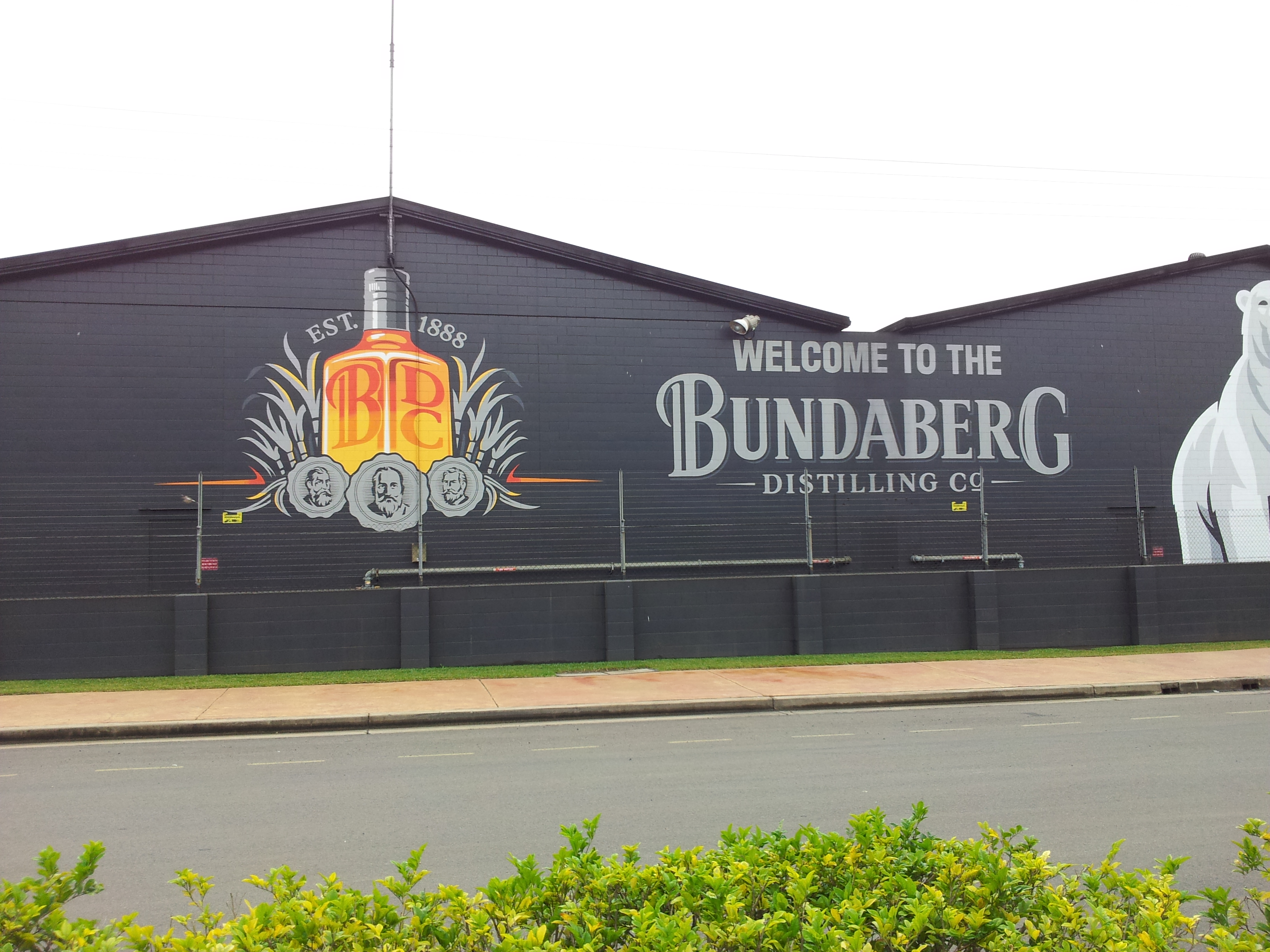
Bundaberg Rum Factory, Circa 2014.

In 1961, the company introduced the polar bear as its unusual choice of mascot, to imply that the rum could ward off the coldest chill.

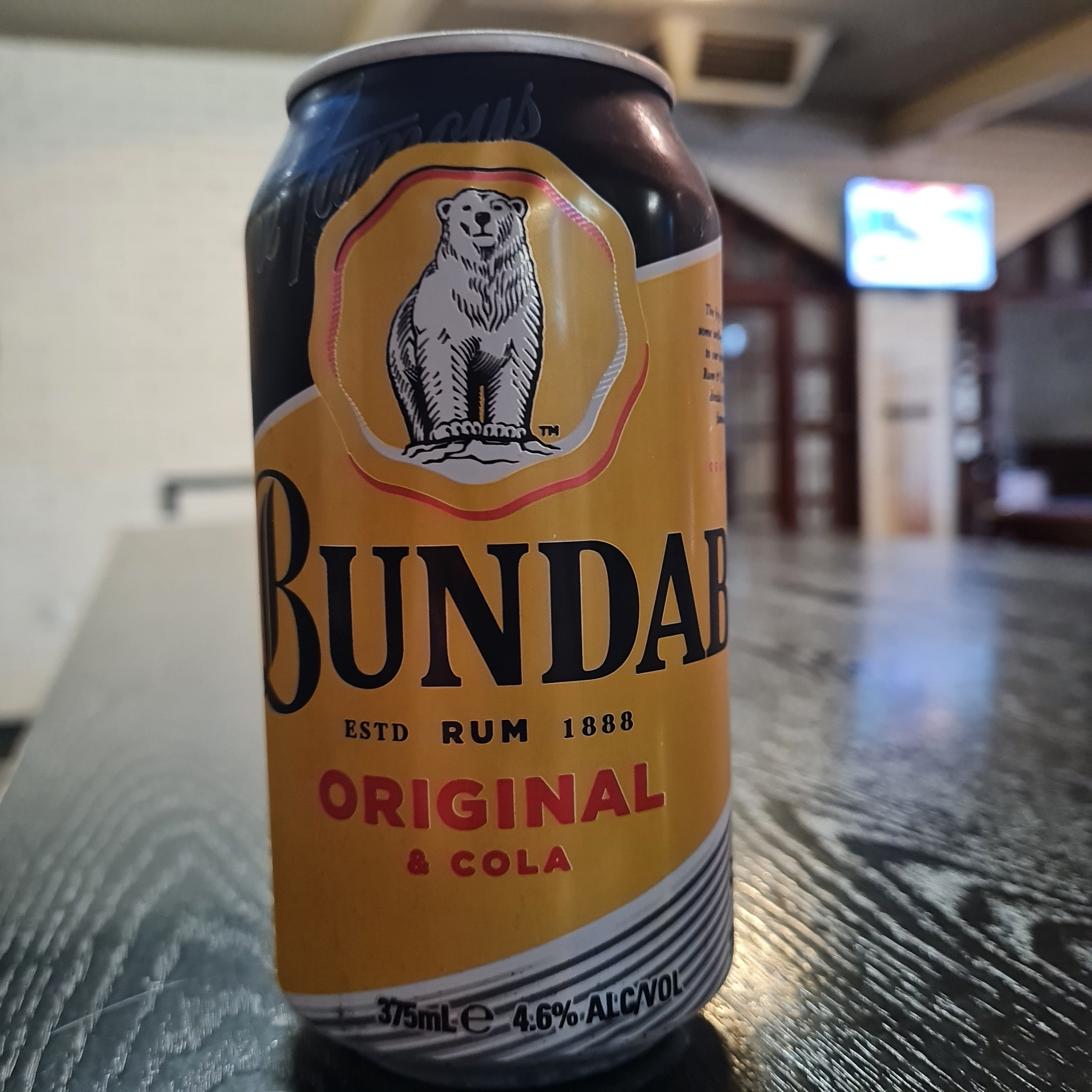
A 375mL can of Bundaberg Original with Cola

In 2000, the Bundaberg Rum company and the distillery were sold to British company Diageo. In 2014, a decision by Diageo to relocate the bottling operations of Bundaberg Rum to the western Sydney suburb of Huntingwood resulted in job losses in Bundaberg. The decision drew criticism from various levels of Queensland politics. The Premier, Campbell Newman, said it was a disappointing move, particularly for a region that had suffered devastating floods in recent years. Bundaberg mayor, Mal Forman, was also disappointed and concerned about the tourism impact.

A Diageo spokeswoman later clarified the situation, saying some premium products, such as the Master Distillers Collection, would continue to be bottled in Bundaberg. "This was not a decision we have taken lightly, however it is a necessary one to ensure the longer term sustainability of the distillery. We remain absolutely committed to Bundaberg and the distillery and will continue to invest and focus on our core business of distilling, maturing and blending great quality rum in Bundaberg as we have done for the last 125 years".

== Distillery ==
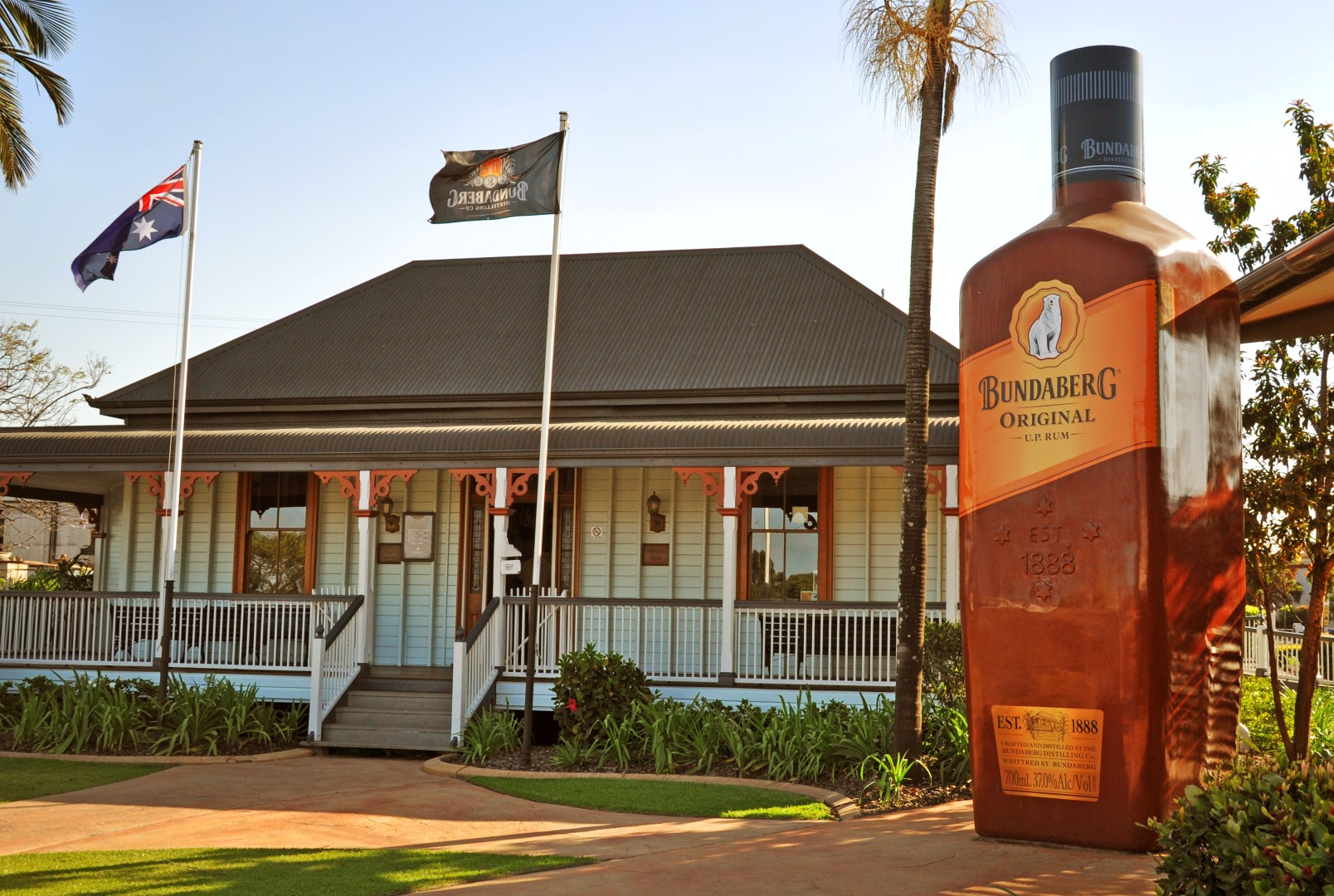
The old Visitors Centre & Big Bundy Bottle

The Bundaberg Rum distillery is open to visitors for tours of the facility. There is also a museum which offers free samples of Bundaberg Rum products for visitors in a historic Queenslander house. The Big Bundy Bottle is also outside of the bond store. A new $8.5 million visitor centre opened to the public in August 2016 replacing the smaller historic house next door.

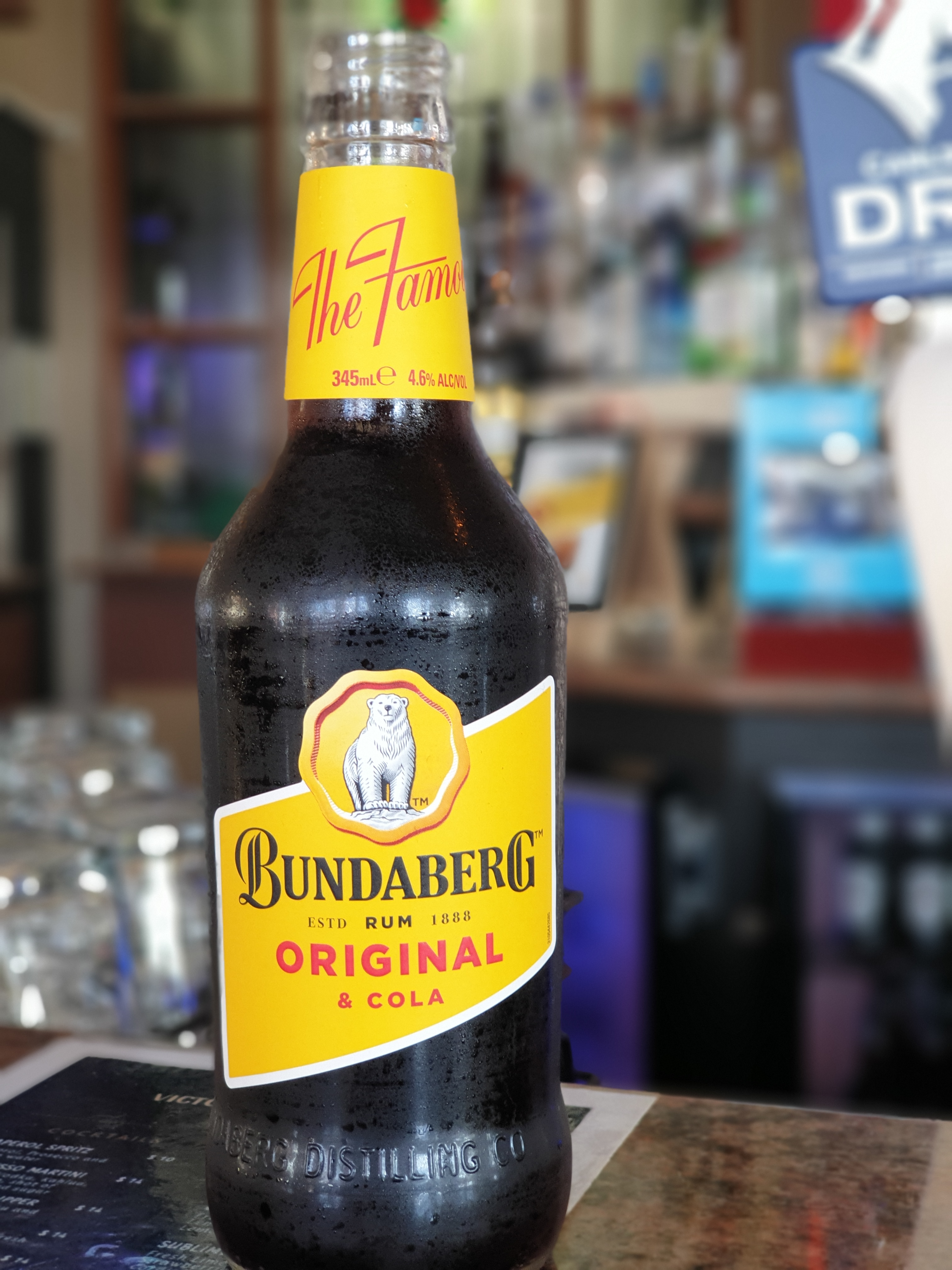
Bundaberg Original & Cola 345mL (11.6 US oz) 4.6% ALC/VOL

In 2009 as part of the Q150 celebrations, the Bundaberg Rum Distillery was announced as one of the Q150 Icons of Queensland for its role as a "location". The State Library of Queensland holds correspondence and financial records from the Bundaberg Distilling Co. Ltd. Records for years 1907 to 1946.

== Variant flavours ==
- Bundaberg Rum UP 37%
- Bundaberg Rum Original 100 Proof 50%
- Bundaberg Rum Overproof 57.7%
- Bundaberg Red 37%
- Bundaberg Red 100 Proof 50%
- Bundaberg Five 37%
- Bundaberg Select Vat Aged 6 Years 37%
- Bundaberg Mutiny Spiced Rum 37%
- Master Distillers' Collection Small Batch 40%
- Master Distillers' Collection Small Batch – Vintage Barrel 40%
- Master Distillers Collection 280 40%
- Master Distillers Collection Black Barrel – Distilled 2004 – Black Glass 40%
- Master Distillers Collection Black Barrel – Distilled 2004 – Clear Glass 40%
- Master Distillers Collection Black Barrel – Distilled 2005 – Clear Glass 40%
- Master Distillers Collection Blenders Edition 2014 40%
- Master Distillers Collection Blenders Edition 2015 40%
- Bundaberg Tropics – Pineapple & Coconut 23.5%
- Bundaberg Royal Liqueur 20%
- Bundaberg Royal Liqueur Banana and Toffee 20%
- Bundaberg Royal Liqueur Coffee and Chocolate 20%
- Bundaberg Royal Liqueur Salted Caramel 20%
- Bundaberg Royal Liqueur Vanilla Spiced 20%
- Bundaberg Royal Liqueur Xmas Puding with Brandy 20%
- Bundaberg Royal Rum Ball 20%
- Bundy Wings Heritage Label Original 37%

== Sponsorship ==
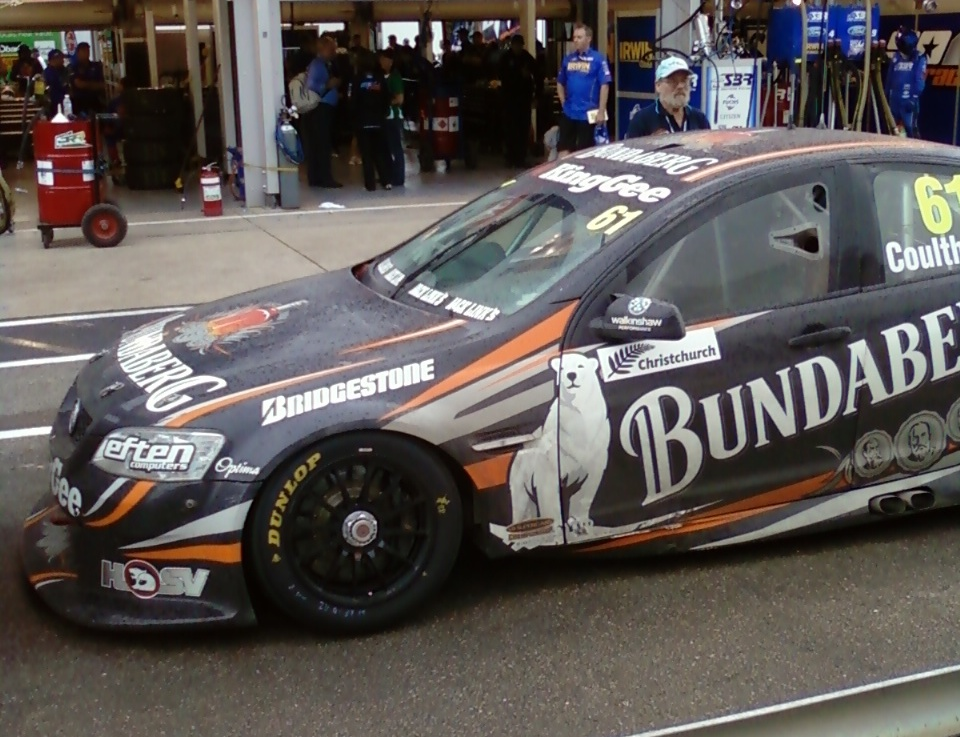
Walkinshaw Racing Holden Commodore VE of Fabian Coulthard at the 2011 Clipsal 500 Adelaide

Bundaberg Rum is a major sponsor of the Australian Wallabies rugby union team and also sponsors the Bundaberg Rum Rugby Series. Bundaberg is also a sponsor of the NSW Waratahs. Bundaberg Rum sponsored the rugby league ANZAC Test till 2009. Bundaberg Rum signed a 5-year deal with the NRL to be the official dark rum of the NRL. They are also the naming-rights sponsor for both NRL Super Saturday and the men's and women's Captain’s Challenge competitions.

From 2009 until 2011, Bundaberg Rum sponsored V8 Supercar team Walkinshaw Racing.

== Recognition ==
Bundaberg Rum has been distinguished with numerous awards. In 2011, Bundaberg Rum's Master Distillers' Collective rum was launched, with the first three releases, the 10 Year Old, Port Barrel and Golden Reserve, winning awards in the global stage.

== Advertising ==
Bundaberg Rum has also been criticised for targeting its advertising towards young people and boys, through television commercials during NRL broadcasts, and other promotions. A series of advertisements featuring the Bundaberg Rum bear, a polar bear known as Bundy R. Bear, were produced by advertising agency Leo Burnett to align the product 'with a larrikin approach to Australian mateship'. The Bundaberg Rum bear first appeared in 1961. It was designed to soften rum's aggressive image and broaden its appeal from the traditional older male drinker to a more sociable audience. The advertisements have been cited as a favourite among Australia's youth.

== See also ==
- Bundaberg Brewed Drinks
- Alcohol Advertising
- ANZAC Test
- Beenleigh Rum
- List of rum producers
- 1936 Bundaberg distillery fire
