= Brownes =

Australian dairy company

Brownes Dairy
- Type: Subsidiary
- Industry: Food manufacturing
- Founded: 1886; 140 years ago
- Founder: Edward Browne
- Headquarters: Balcatta, Western Australia, Australia
- Owner: Australia Zhiran Co
- Number of employees: ~300 (2025)
- Website: brownesdairy.com.au

Variously flavoured milks made by Brownes

Brownes Dairy is an Australian dairy company. It produces dairy products such as milk, cheese and yoghurt for the domestic and international market. The company is the oldest and largest dairy processor in Western Australia.

== History ==
Brownes was established in 1886. It became the first Western Australian company to produce flavoured milk in 1951.

In 1955 the family company became a public company, changing its name from Brownes Limited to Brownes Dairy limited.

The company began making yoghurt in 1959. Ice cream company Peters acquired Brownes in 1962. In the 1970s, Brownes started making sour cream and feta cheese.

In 2010, Fonterra sold Brownes to DairyWest, a subsidiary of private investment firm Archer Capital. In July 2012, Brownes acquired Casa Dairy, a maker of niche products like European-style cheeses and buttermilk located in Canning Vale.

Brownes was fined $100,000 in July 2014 after waste milk from its Brunswick facility spilled into a nearby creek causing fish to die and a foul odour. The company also spent about four weeks and about $387,000 to clean up the spill.

In November 2017, Brownes was purchased by Australia Zhiran Co, a Chinese consortium led by Shanghai Ground Food Tech.

In July 2021, Brownes was fined $22,000 by the Australian Competition and Consumer Commission after it published two milk supply agreements on its website in June 2020 which did not comply with the Dairy Code.

In 2024, Brownes launched its Hunt & Brew coffee brand in the United Kingdom. In October 2025, the company acquired its UK co-packer.

The Brownes business was put on the market in April 2025 after its parent company defaulted on a $200 million loan.

== Operations ==
Annually, Brownes collects about 120 million litres of milk from over 50 farms. Brownes has processing facilities located in Balcatta, Brunswick and Shanghai. It also has a manufacturing facility in Hungerford, UK. As of 2010, the company processes 40 per cent of WA's milk production. The company employs around 300 people.
