= Owasippe Scout Reservation =

Scout Reservation in Michigan

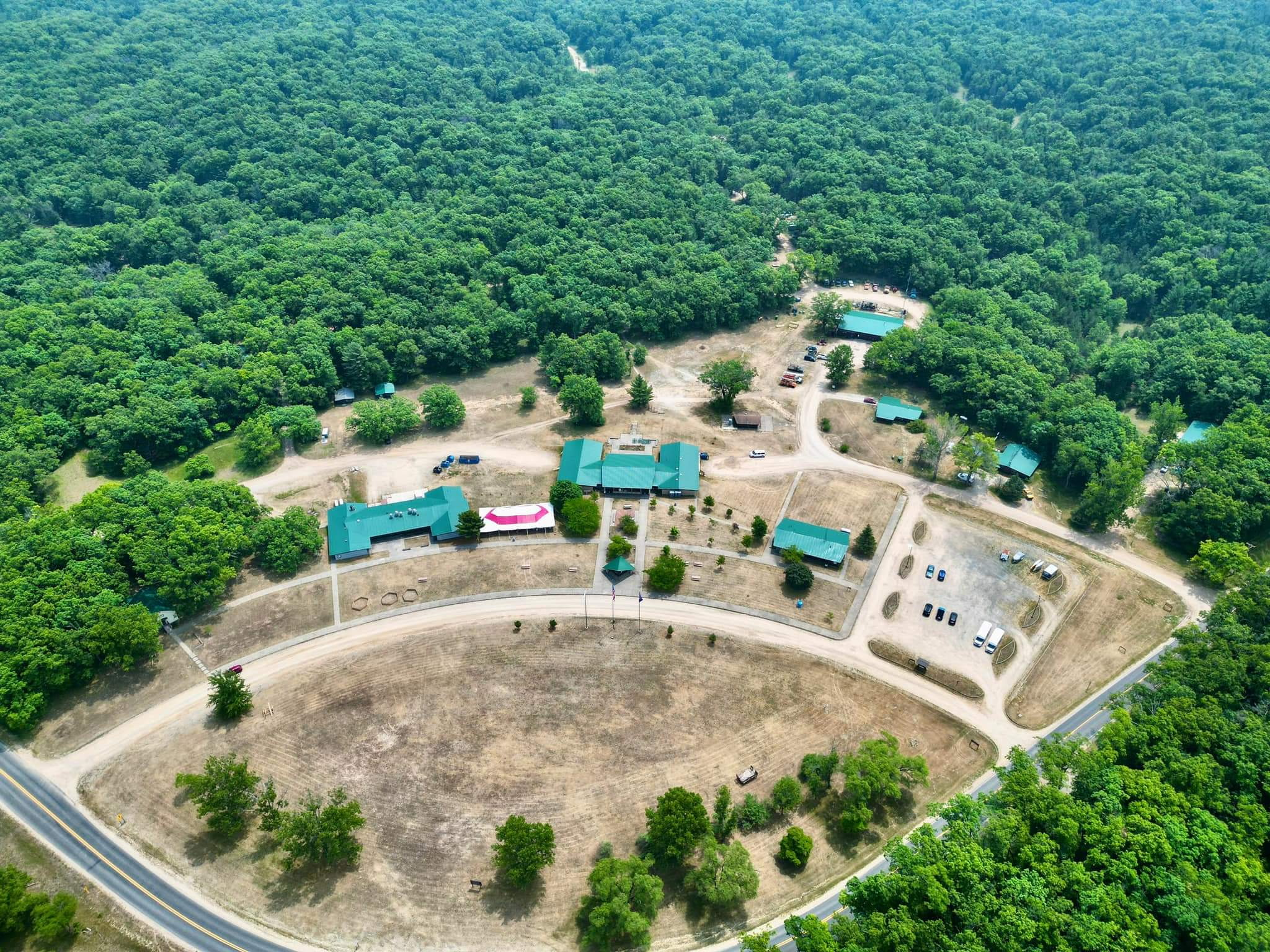
- The Reservation Administrative Campus
- Owasippe Reservation Flag
- Location: 9900 Russell Rd. Twin Lake, Michigan
- Coordinates: 43.3972°N 86.2792°W
- Founded: 1911 (115 Years Ago)
- Founders: A. Stamford White, President, Chicago Board of Trade
- Attendance: 5104 (2024)
- Reservation Director: Dalton B. DeVries (2025 - present)
- Head Ranger: Robert Cook (May 2026 - present)
- Affiliation: Scouting America
- Governing body: Pathway to Adventure Council (Chicago, IL)
- Website; Official website

Owasippe Scout Reservation (OSR), located in Twin Lake, Michigan is the resident camp operated by the Pathway to Adventure Council (formerly Chicago Area Council) of Scouting America. It began in 1911 as Camp White on 40 acres (16 ha) of land on Crystal Lake donated by the White Lake Chamber of Commerce. Owasippe is currently the United States' oldest and longest continuously operating Scout camp.

In 2026, Owasippe celebrated 115 years of operation, coinciding with the United States' Semiquincentennial.

== Background ==
Coined in the 1970's by Reservation Director Edward Black, Owasippe is touted as "America's Premier Scout Camp," continuously operating since 1911. The camp first started on 40 acres from the chamber of commerce and grew exponentially into the 1960's. At its peak, the reservation covered 11,000 acres (4,500 ha) and served over 10,000 Scouts per summer, but the overall decline in Scouting nationwide has seen yearly attendance fall to approximately 5,100 campers. Previous property consolidations have left the camp at 4,800 acres (1,900 ha) in size.

Chicago is the home to Scouting in America, having been incorporated in 1910 by Chicago Printing Executive W. D. Boyce after returning from a trip to England (Lone Scout story). Boyce and other American outdoor pioneers founded the Boy Scouts of America in the heart of downtown Chicago in the Boyce Building at 54 W. Illinois St. on February 8, 1910. Soon after came the foundation of Owasippe's first camps under the name "A. Stamford White Scout Camps" in recognition of A. Stamford White, Chicago Board of Trade President, who led the search for the property.

In 2002, the Chicago Area Council announced its decision to sell the camp but met with stiff resistance from the local community, Scouts, leaders, families, and staff alumni. The Holland-based developer was set to purchase the land for a sum of $19 million and planned to redevelop the land as summer residences. For this to move forward, the zoning for the land needed to be changed for development, which the Blue Lake Township Board voted against. During this time, Owasippe continued to operate. The deal with the developer was terminated on November 7, 2008.

In 2011, the Reservation celebrated its centennial anniversary, featuring several guests and gathering praise from a spectrum of entities ranging from local government to both the State governments of Illinois and Michigan. Celebrations for the centennial were held at the Ad Center with campers from all camps (Reneker, Carlen, Blackhawk, Wolverine) in attendance.

In 2015, Owasippe's owner, the Chicago Area Council, merged with other local Chicagoland Scout Councils (Northwest Suburban Council, Des Plaines Valley Council, and Calumet Area Council of Northwest Indiana), forming Pathway to Adventure Council (PTAC). The council continues to operate its headquarters out of Chicago in the West Loop neighborhood. Owasippe is one of two camps owned by PTAC and serves as the council's flagship camp for Scout resident camping. PTAC's other property, located in Berrien Springs, MI, is Camp Frank S. Betz primarily for Cub Camp, Order of the Arrow, and Family Camp programs.

The reservation is composed of sub-camps within the property. The current operating sub-camps are Camp Blackhawk (Scouts BSA camp), Camp Wolverine (Scouts BSA and Cub Scouts), and Camp Reneker (Family Camp). There is also a high adventure base at Owasippe featuring a high ropes course, river trips on the White River, mountain biking, ATV courses, and a horse ranch.

Owasippe is currently staffed by 200 Scouters serving an average of 5,000 Scouts over seven weeks every season.

== Owasippe Scout Camps; First Encampments and Original Subcamps ==
With the foundation of Scouting in Chicago, A. Stamford White and other businessmen set out to West Michigan to locate the site for the camp. The logical decision to found a camp was derived from Sir Robert Baden-Powell's strategy with Gilwell Island to provide an outdoor Scouting experience for Scouting's program and youth to thrive.

=== Camp White ===
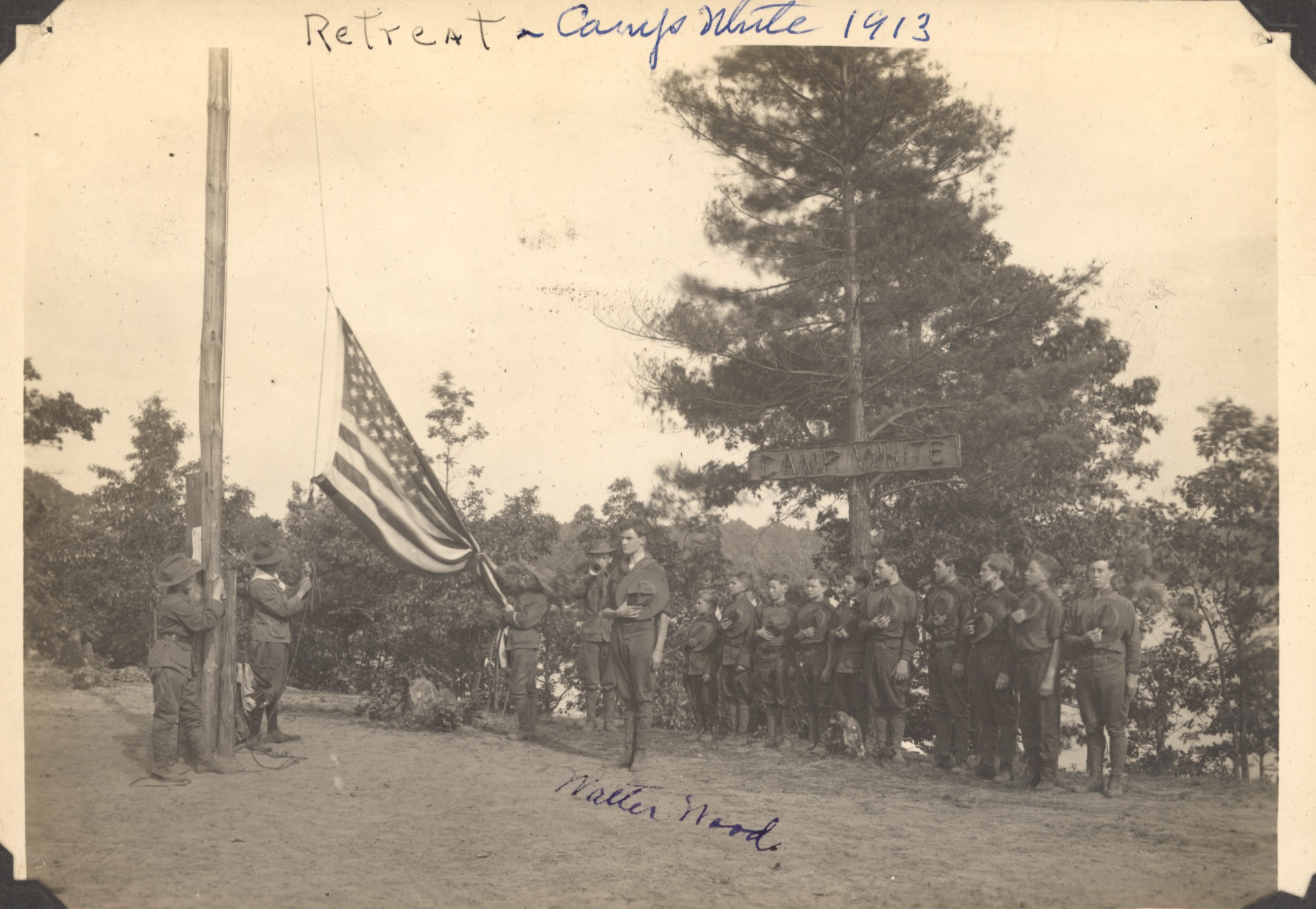
A flag raising ceremony at Camp White, 1913.

Owasippe' s first camp was held in 1912 on the northern shore of Crystal Lake, now known as Owasippe lake. Following the first camping season, in the spring of 1913, a 70' by 86' Dining Hall with a generator and electric lights and an icehouse would be constructed. This building would later be used as the Camp Beard Dining Hall. There was a photo shop and dark room with running water and a trading post. At these early camps, while scouts worked on merit badges, they were expected to engage in other activities as well. These include canoeing, rowboats, lectures, cooking, baseball games, swimming, fishing, and overnight hikes. Scouts would often help improve the camp as well, such as in 1916 when scouts helped build the merit badge lodge.

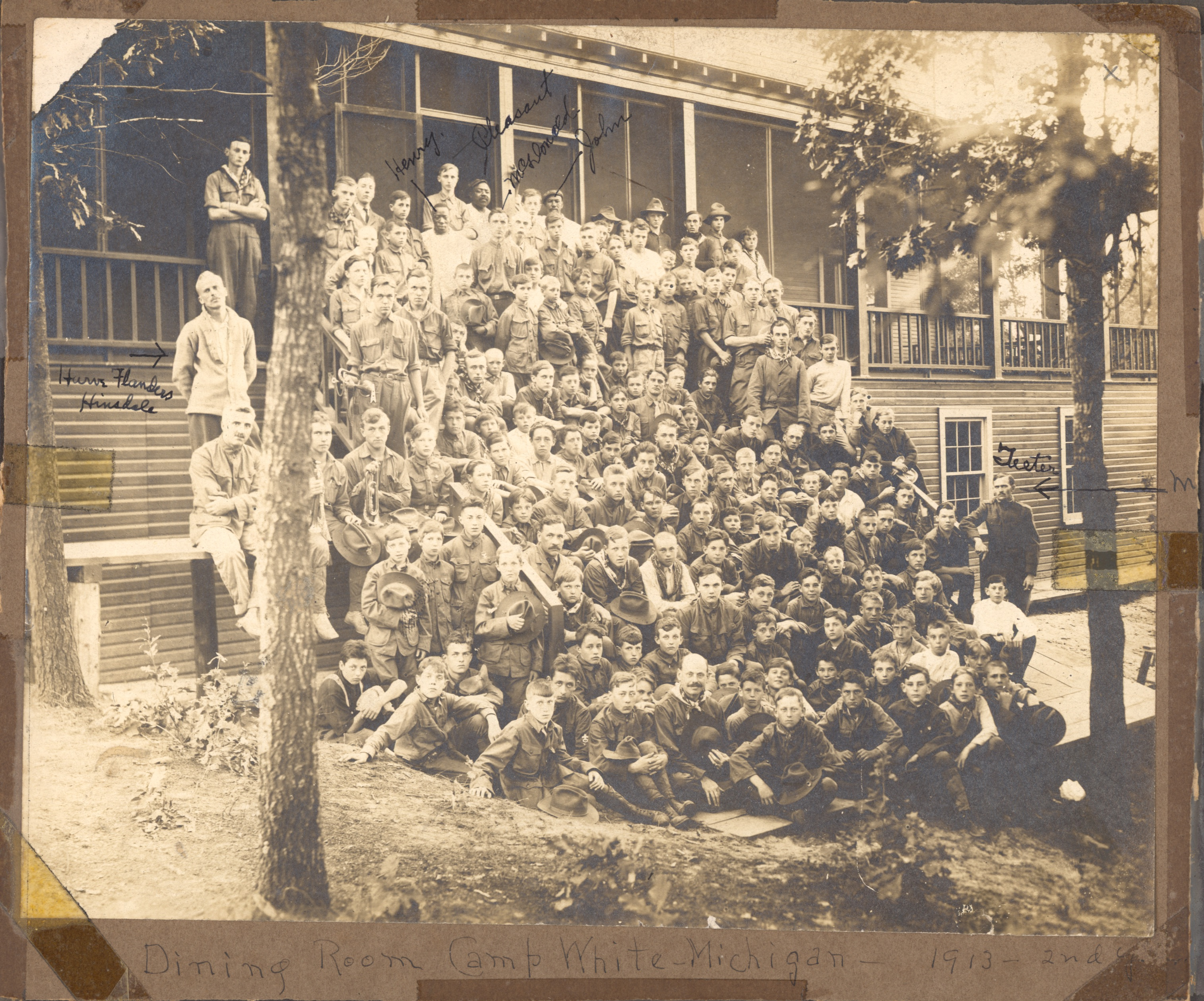
Dining hall at Camp White, 1913.

Occasionally, such as one instance in 1919, movies were shown in the dining hall. It was standard that all scouts would stay for two weeks before going home, with the more advanced scouts staying extra time for leadership courses. The camp would be separated by 1922, into Camp West and Camp Beard, and later, Camp McDonald.

=== Crystal Lake Family Camp ===
In addition to camps for scouts, Owasippe has had a strong tradition of families and women camping, too. Evidence of this traces back to 1912, when R.W Teeter brought his family, who camped near the scouts.

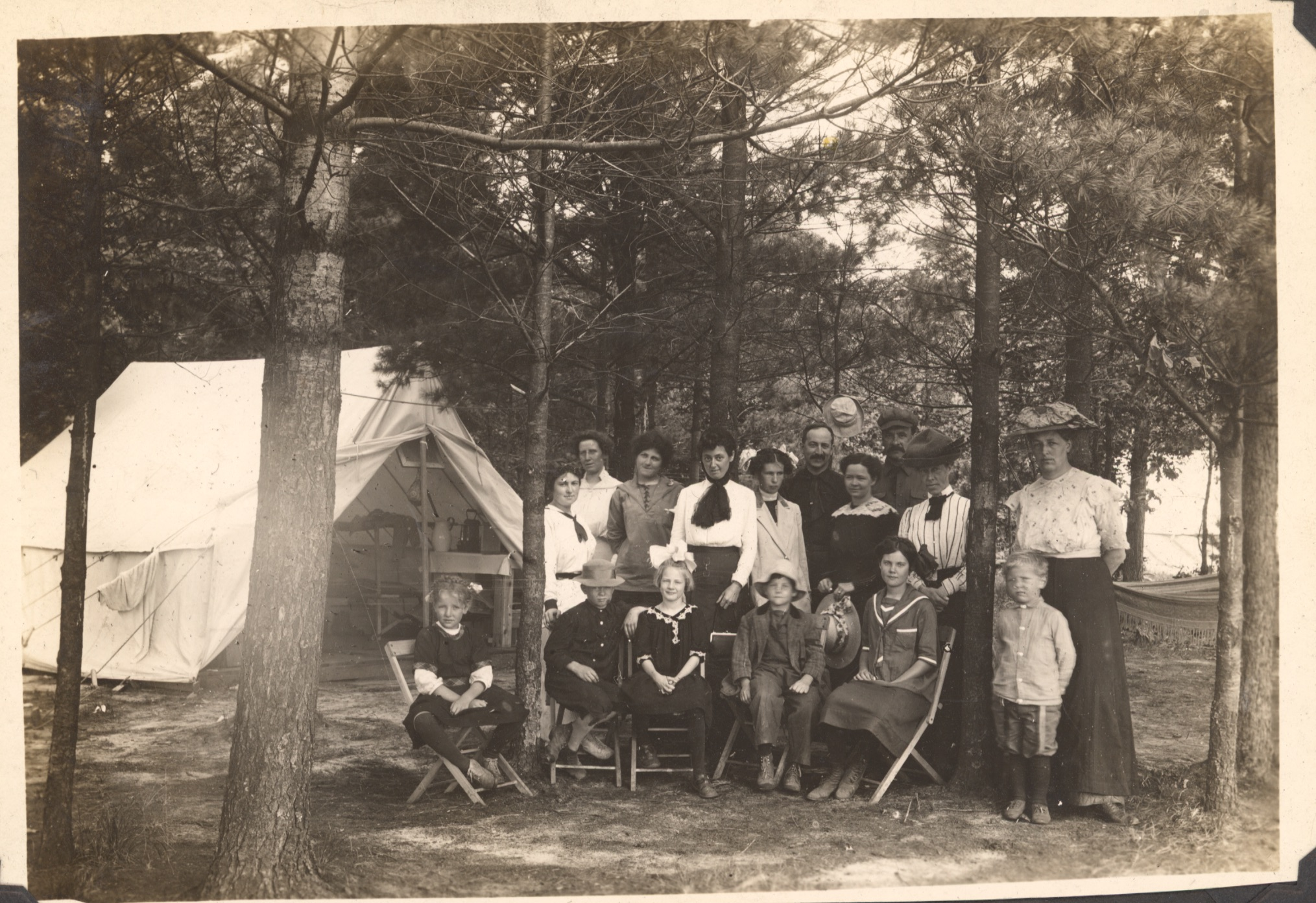
The first Owasippe Family Camp, 1913.

Sometime after 1917, a new dining hall was built near Camp Stuart overlooking Crystal Lake. Programs here included hiking, artwork, sports, and swimming, and would usually have fewer staff members. This camp would function until 1964, when a new family camp (Renamed Camp Reneker) was built just south of Lake Wolverine.

=== Camp Dan Beard ===
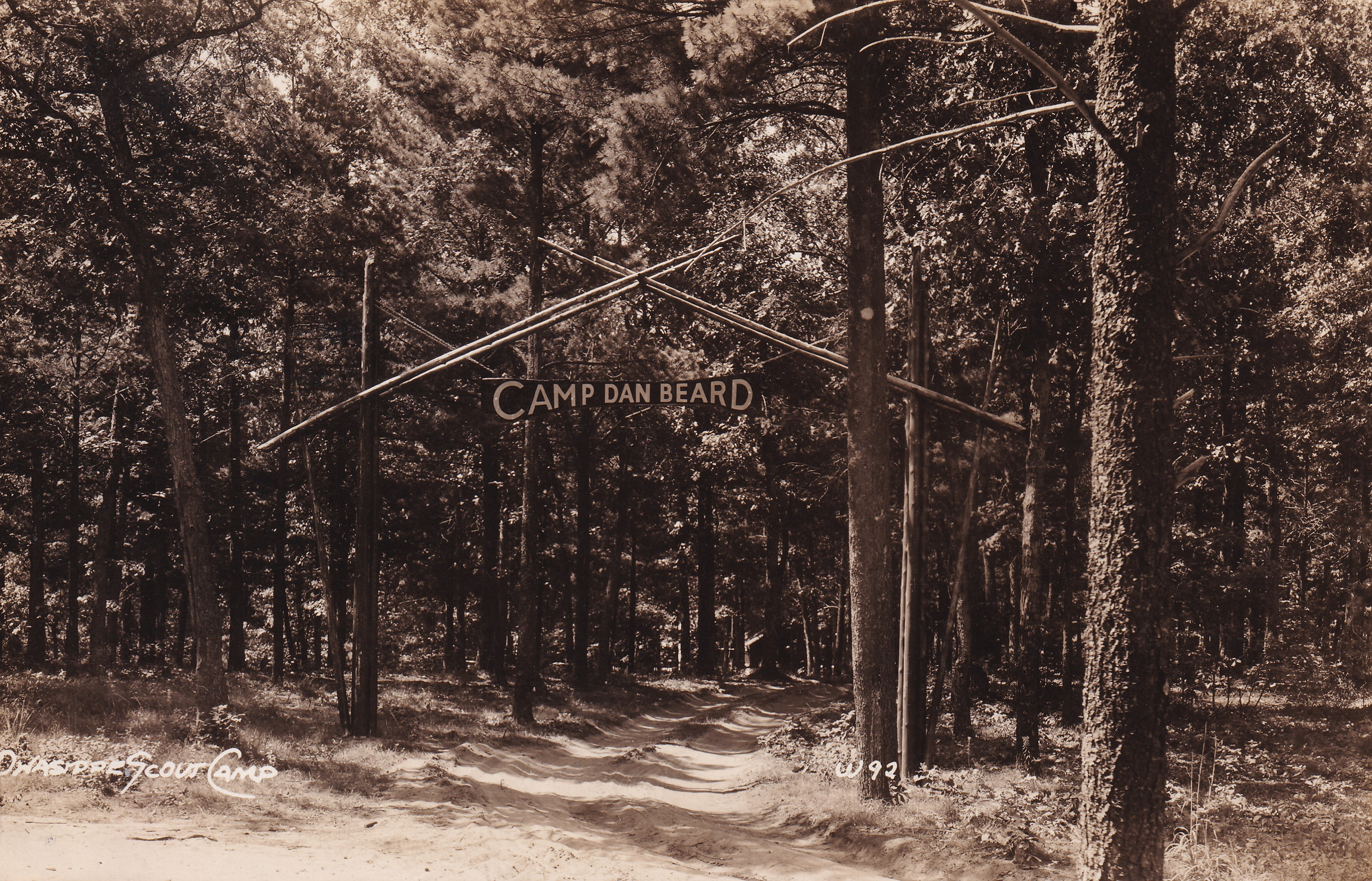
The Entrance to Camp Beard, 1950.

Named after early scouting founder Daniel Carter Beard, this camp was created from Camp White's split. With this split, there also started to be a noticeable trend with each Chicago Scouting District getting its own camp,

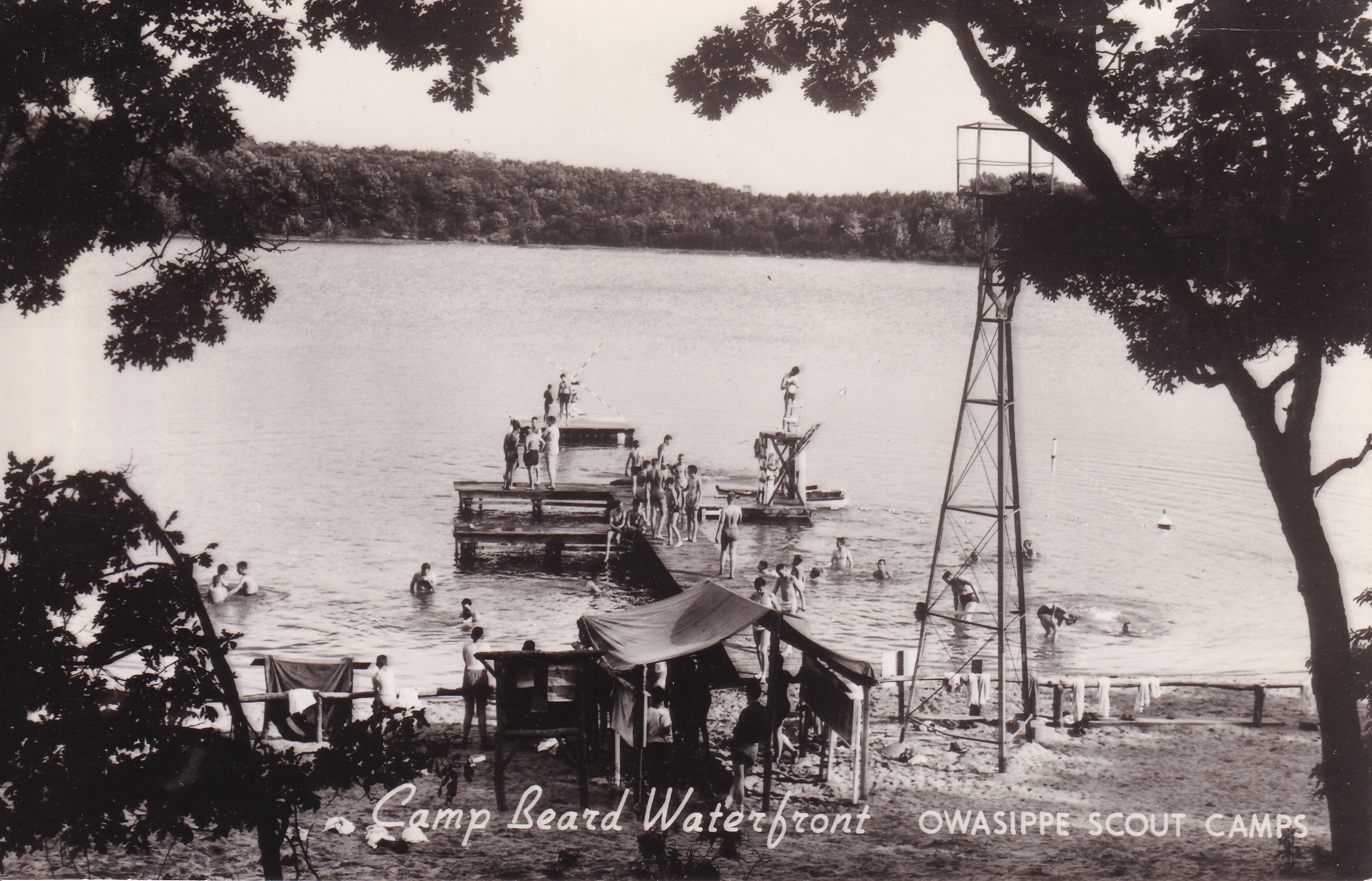
Camp Beard waterfront in the 1950s.

with Beard being used by the scouts of the North Shore District. It used the same dining hall and much of the same land as Camp White, and would steadily develop its program areas and traditions. From the early 1930s to the late 1950s, the camps made minor developments, such as new pumphouses or shower houses. By the 1960s, however, it became clear that the facilities were obsolete. In 1968, the Dining Hall was torn down, and the camp would eventually close in 1970. Like Camp West, however, much of the remaining infrastructure would stay there until the land was cleared by developers, being used by scouts for hikes and for leadership training events.

In the Spring of 2026 the last remaining undeveloped parcel of land on Owasippe Lake was sold for private development. This section of property was at the location where Camp Beard once stood.

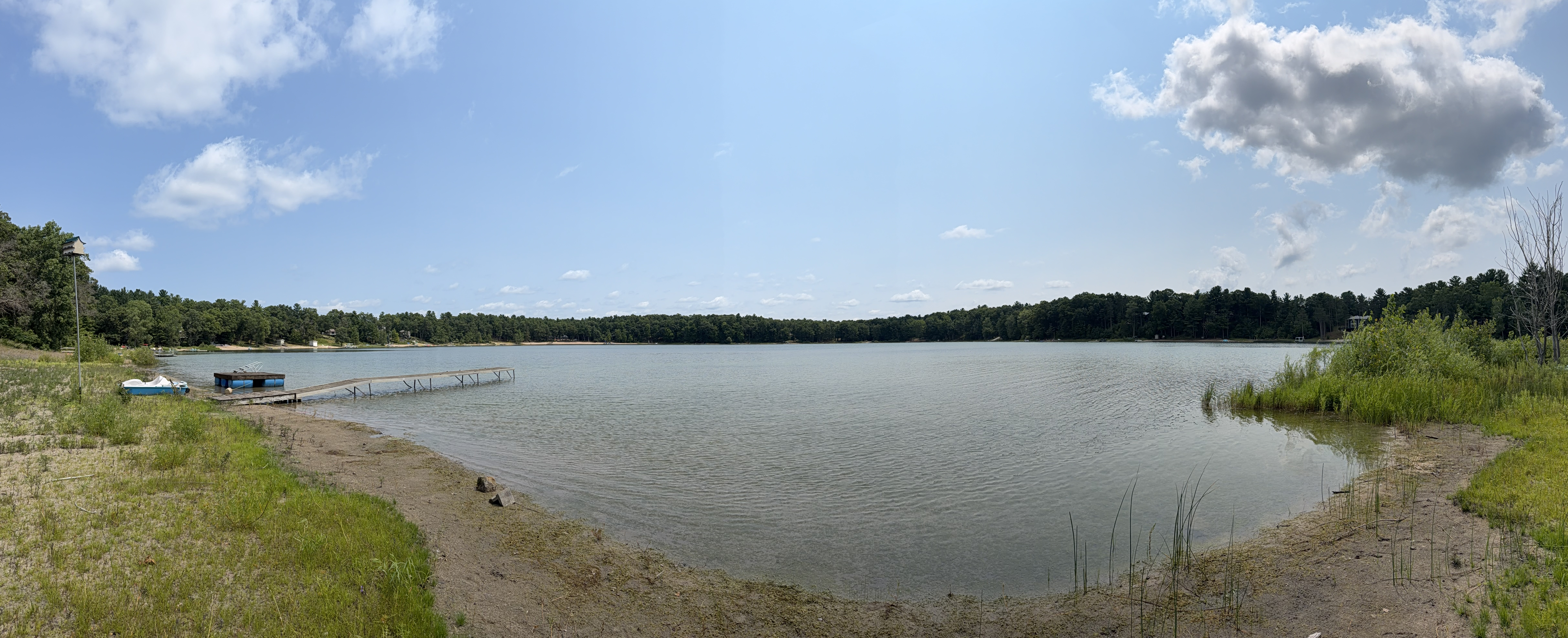
Owasippe Lake, July 2026, from the former Camp Beard waterfront. Former Stuart Waterfront on far left.

=== Camp Stuart/McDonald ===
Camp Stuart was opened in 1922, and was originally called Camp McDonald. The camp was originally named after the scout executive Louis L. McDonald, an early Scout Executive. It was renamed Camp Stuart in honor of R. Douglas Stuart, who had been president of the council for over 25 years when the camp was renamed in 1935. He was also a member of the family that owned the famous Quaker Oats Company. Camp Stuart was located on the south side of Crystal Lake. It operated as a fully-staffed dining hall camp. The camp originally served the Southwest District scouts, but it would outgrow this concept and serve scouts from all over the Chicago area. It had several structures unique to camp and would retain a remarkably similar layout throughout the years. A hand-drawn map from the early 1930s shows a Dining Hall and Showers, Hospital, Trading Post, Handicraft Cabin, Woodcraft Lodge, Zoo and the famous Blockhouse. As the name suggests, scouts would work on merit badges there in the early days, it also functioned as a mult-purpose space for camp events and lessons. A 1967 map of Camp Stuart shows much of the same, including the Blockhouse, Handicraft moving near the Blockhouse, Campcraft replacing Woodcraft (the equivalent to scoutcraft), and the Merit Badge Lodge taking the place as the Office. The Dining Hall was identical to the one built at Camp West, and would remain standing until 1977, when it was cleared out. Throughout the 1970s, much of the aging infrastructure of the camp would be torn down or destroyed, including the Merit Badge Lodge in the early 1970s, and the Blockhouse in a storm in 1968. Stuart's last year of operation was 1978.

Camp Stuart
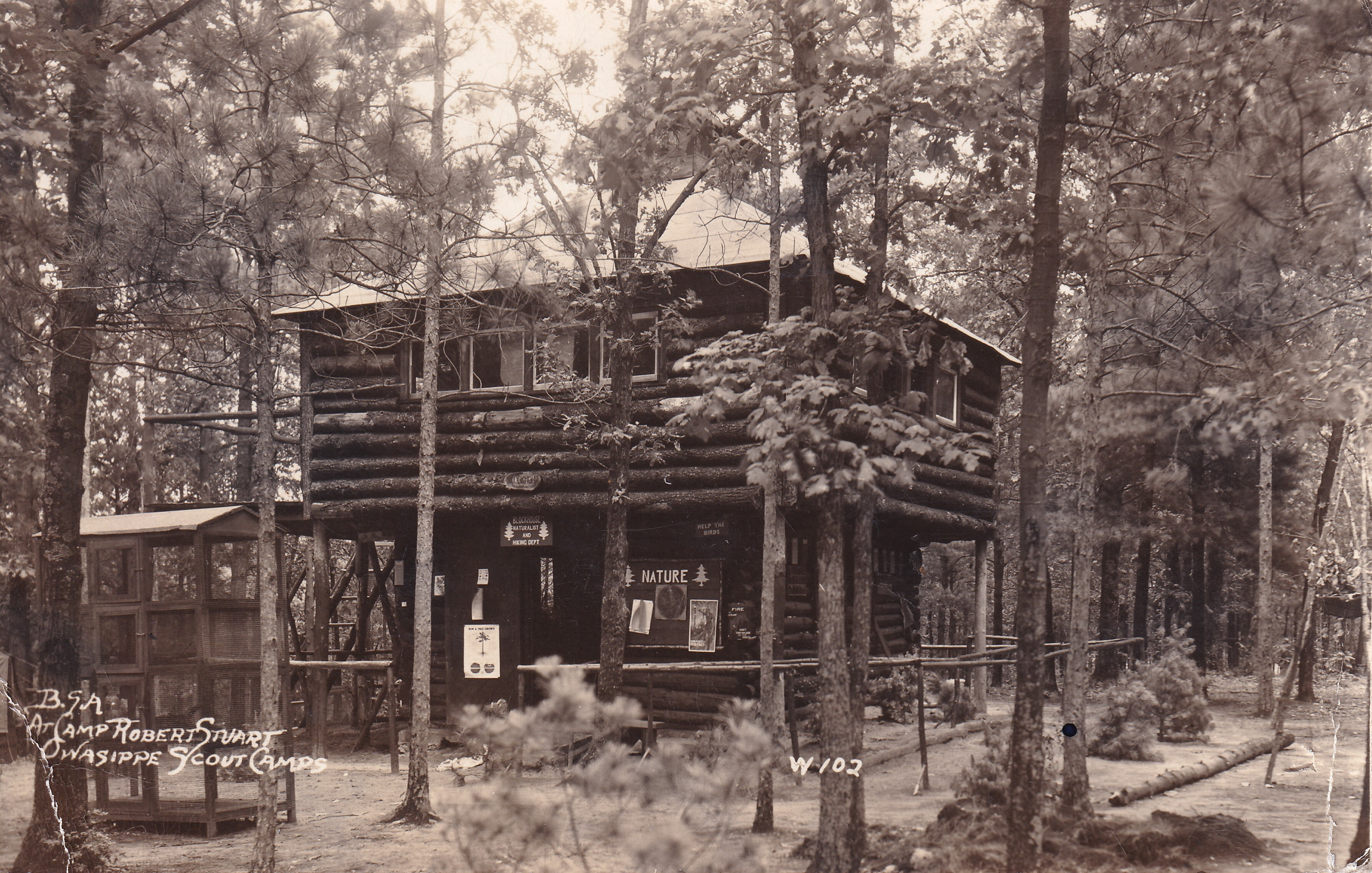
Front view of Stuart Blockhouse, 1947.

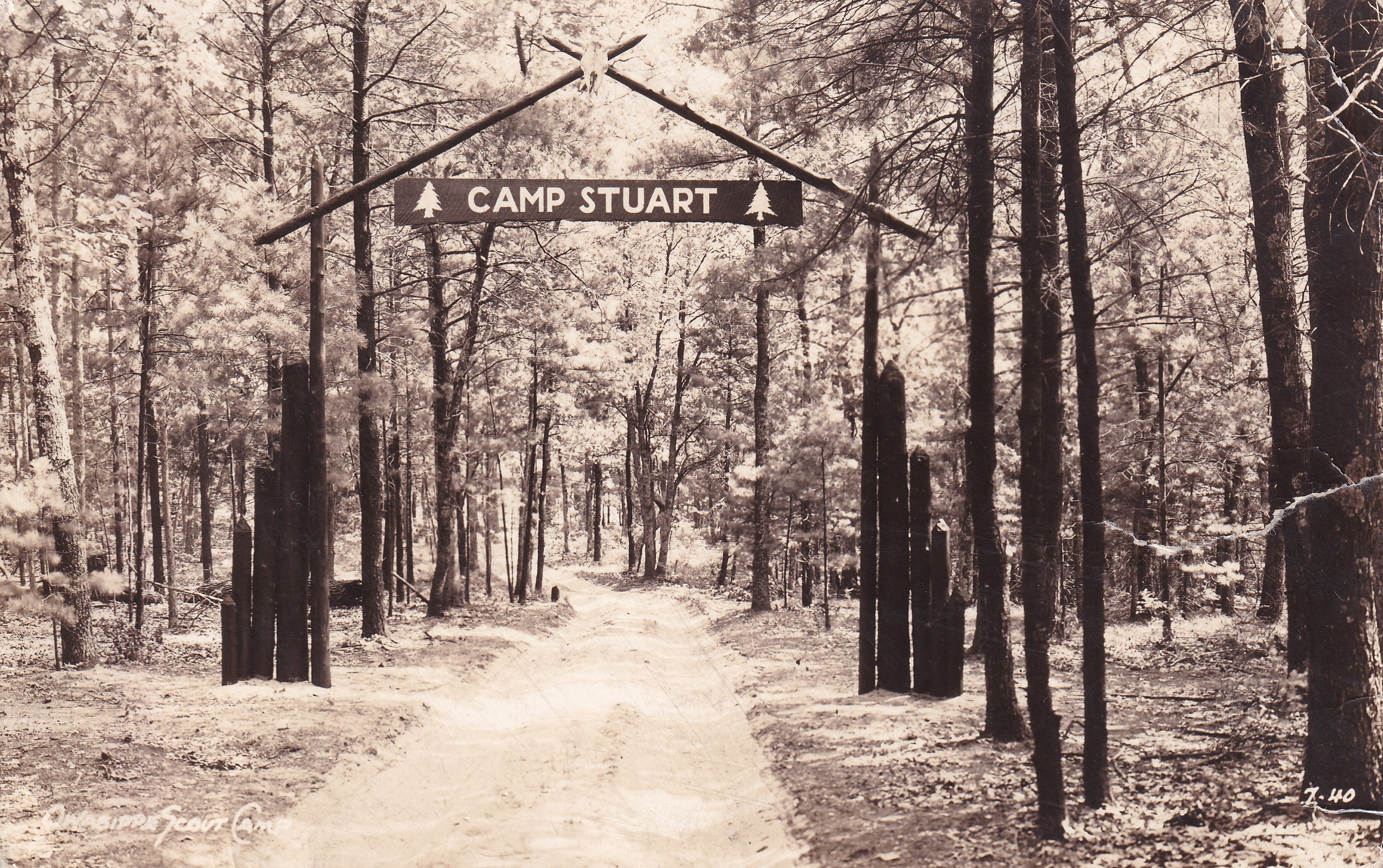
Entrance to Camp

== Traveling to Camp ==
Over the 115 years of Owasippe there were three main modes of transportation before the use of personal vehicles and organized unit transportation. Scouts traveling to Owasippe from Chicago arrived by ship, train, and busses. These modes of transportation were organized by the Scout Council office.

=== S.S. Carolina ===
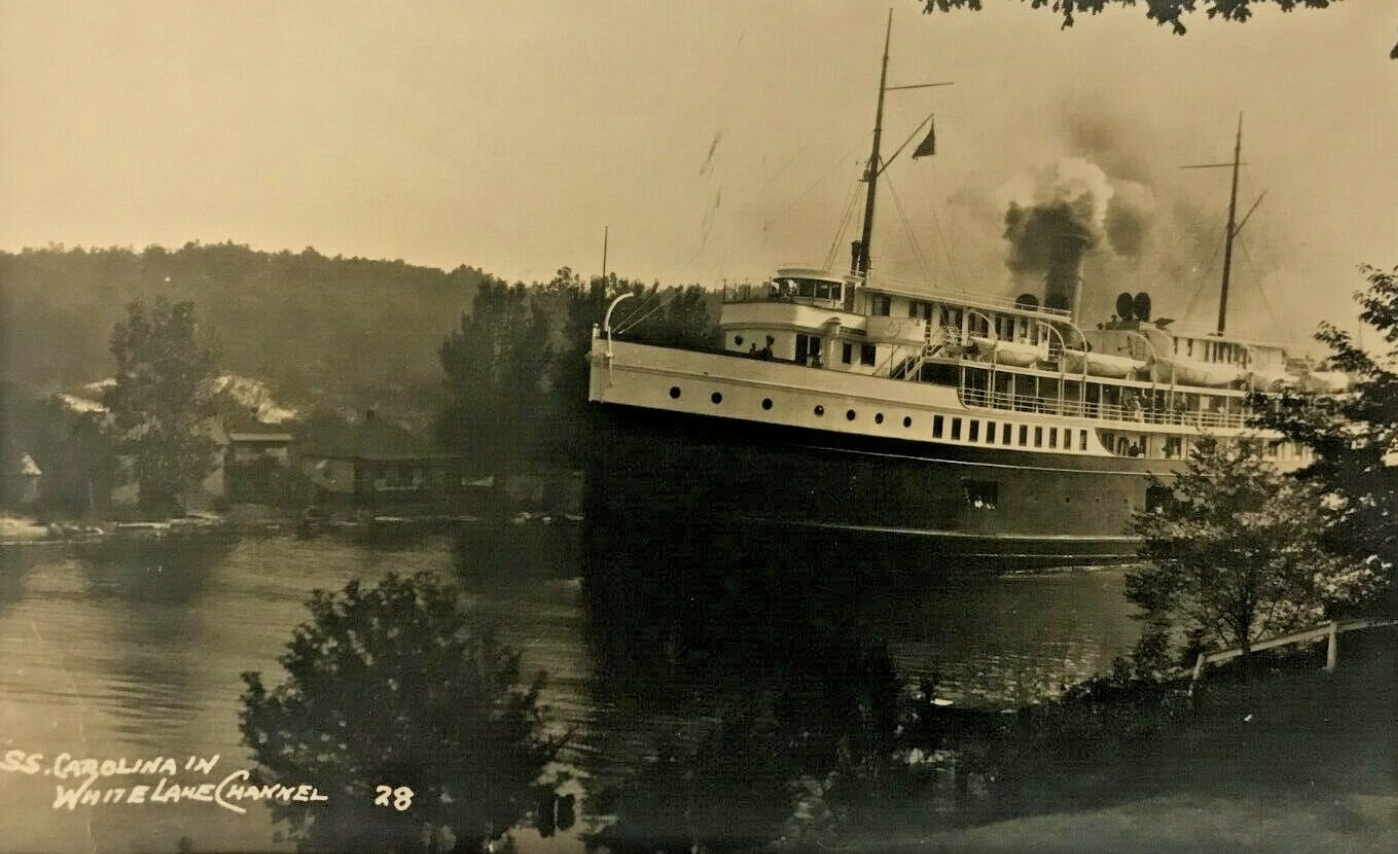
SS Carolina entering White Lake Channel

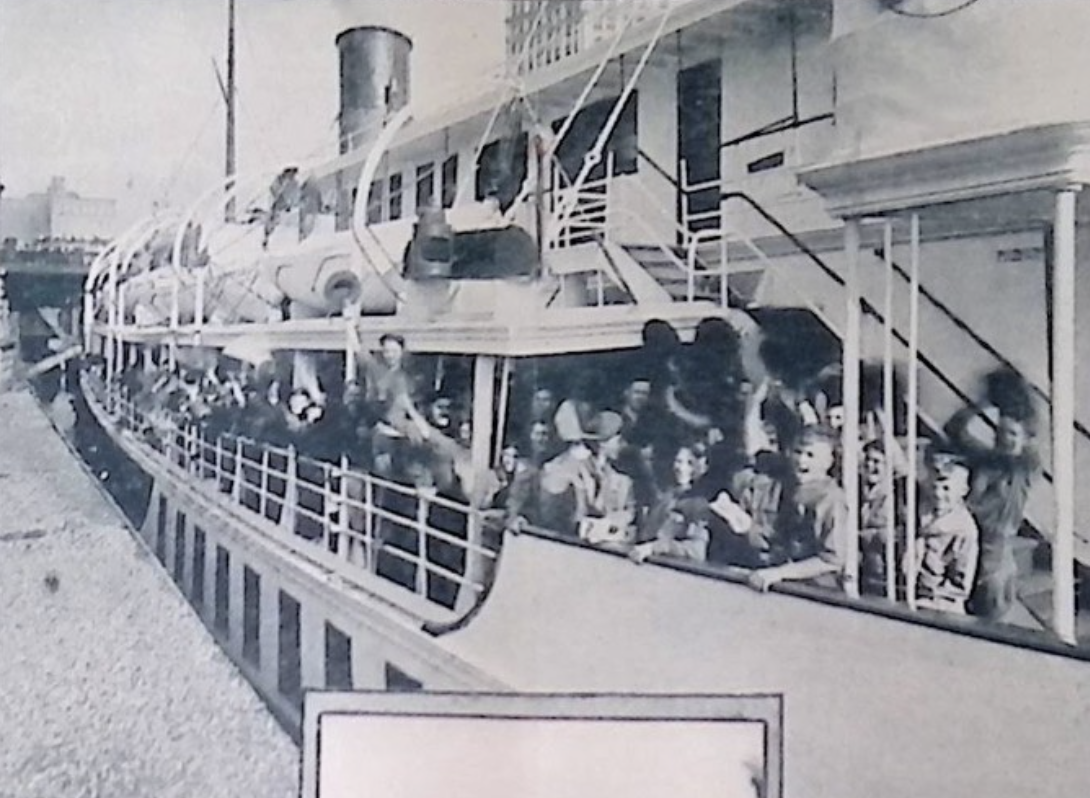
Scouts boarding the Carolina in Chicago

Beginning with the start of the first camps, Scouts traveled to camp aboard the S.S Carolina across Lake Michigan. The Goodrich Transit Company serviced Chicago Scouts on a seasonal line that went from Chicago to White Lake. The ship would depart it's docks on the Chicago River and travel to White Lake's harbor in Whitehall, MI. Upon arrival Scouts would disembark beginning a 5 mile trek East inland to the encampments at Owasippe Lake. During later years the Scouts would be met by Owasippe trucks to assist units coming to camp with more gear.

The return voyage departed from White Lake at 8 p.m. Sunday night, arriving at Chicago at 6 a.m. Monday morning.

With changing needs and growing attendance at Owasippe, the ship was eventually phased out of Scouting usage. The Goodrich Transit Co. filed for bankruptcy and closed in 1933. Carolina was stripped and became a stone barge from 1937 to 1950.

=== Pere Marquette Railway ===
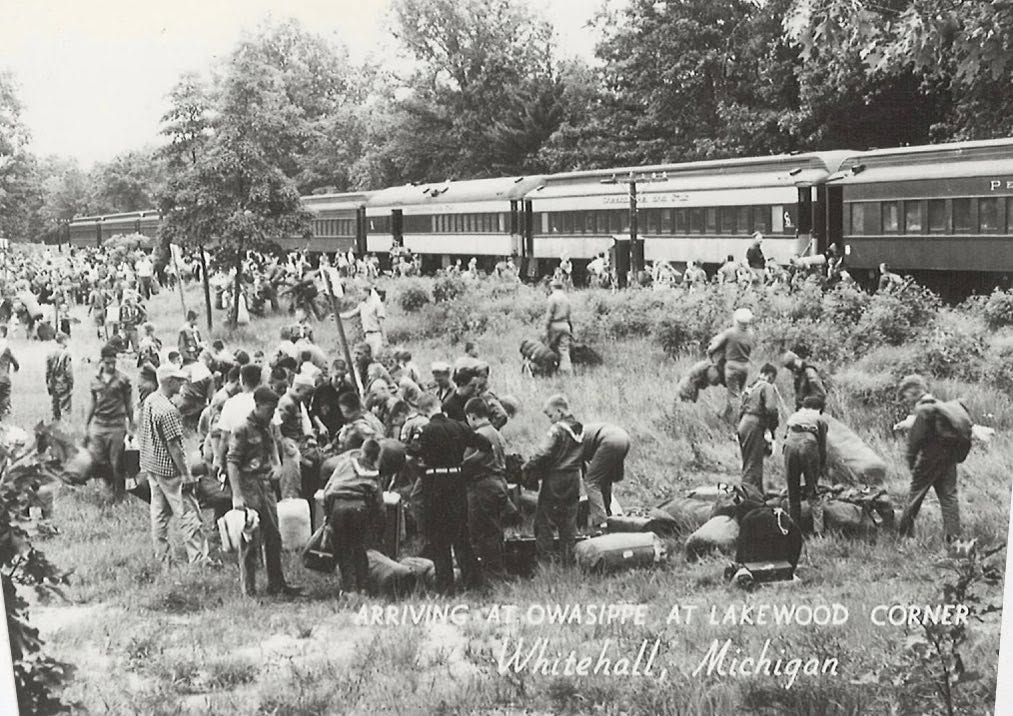
Scouts disembark the Pere Marquette at Lakewood Club

After the S.S Carolina was phased out of use, Owasippe made arrangements with the Pere Marquette Line for transit from Chicago to Lakewood Club.

Scouts travelled to Owasippe by train on Pullman railcars. The "Special Scout Train" would depart Chicago from the Old Grand Central Station at Harrison & Wells on the Pere Marquette Line. From Chicago, the train would travel up to the Reservation, stopping in Lakewood Club in an open field called a "Whistle Stop".

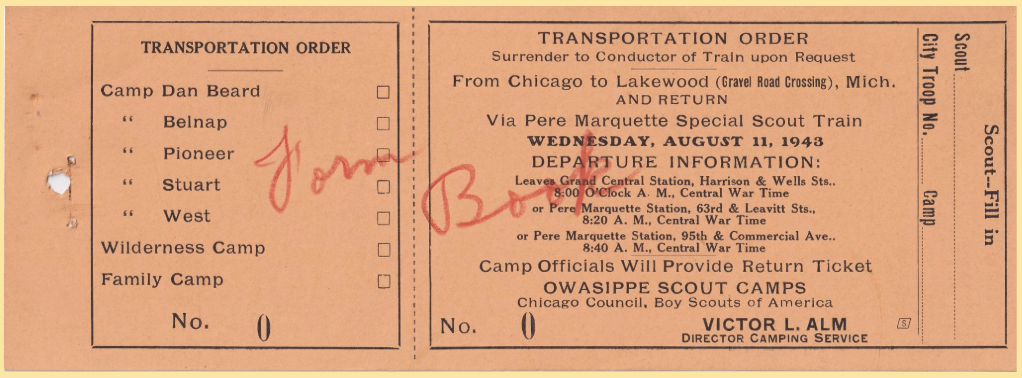
Scout Train Ticket

Special tickets would be printed by the railroad for Scouts with special information specific to Owasippe Scout Camps, such as their assigned subcamp.

The actual Lakewood Club stop was not large enough to accommodate the masses of Scouts disembarking the train with their gear, so the train would stop in a nearby field before the station. In this field, the train was met by Owasippe Staff and trucks to load their gear. From here, Scouts would hike with their units the distance to camp. From the mid-1920's onwards, Scouts who camped at the new camps being settled around Big Blue Lake would ride in the back of stake bed trucks across the property the farther distance.

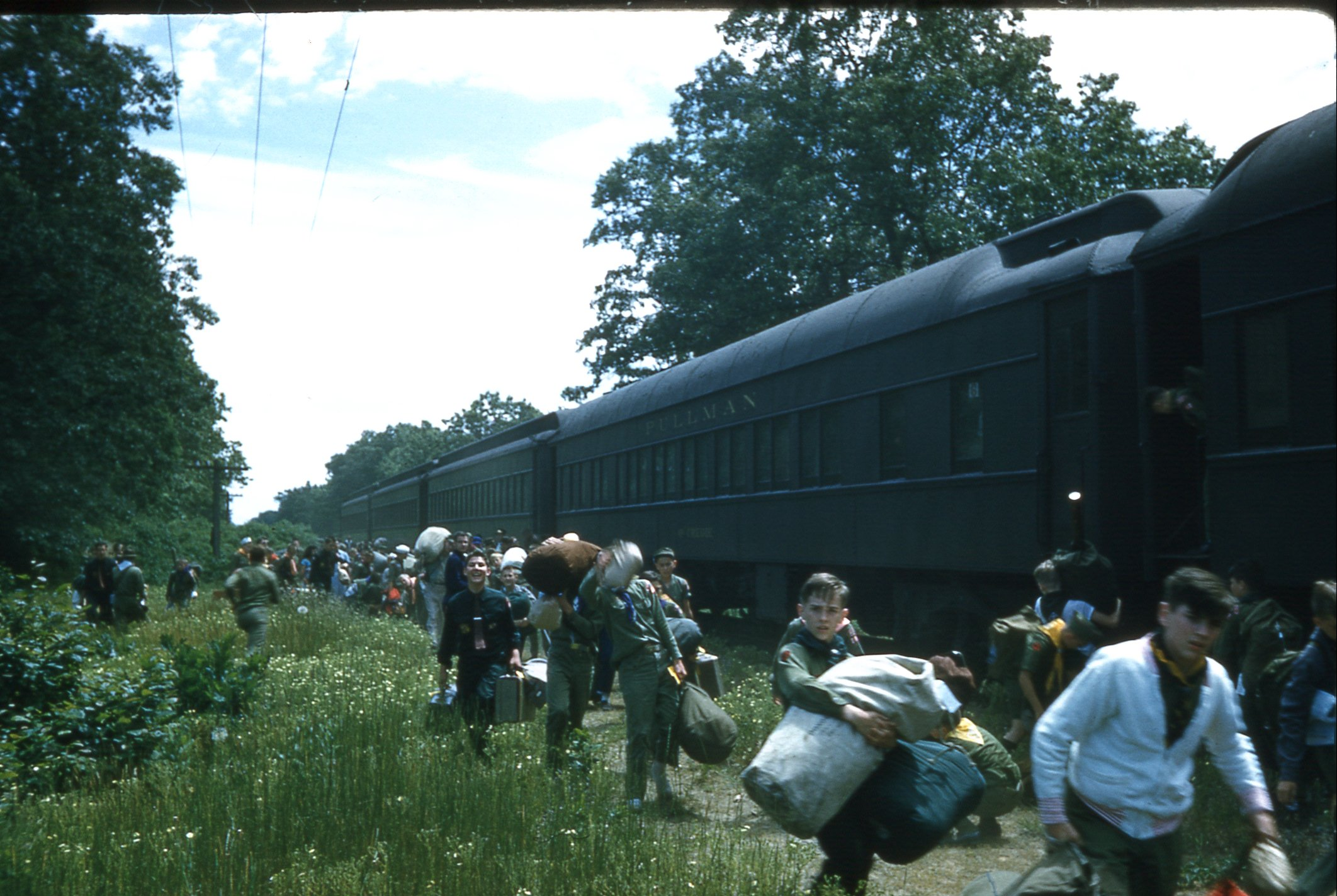
Chicago Troop 608 Scouts disembark Scout Train, July 1960

The Scout Train service continued till the late 1960's. The locomotive that carried Scouts from the Pere Marquette was Berkshire #1223 and is currently on display in Grand Haven, MI. The locomotive was also famously used as inspiration for the engine in The Polar Express.

== Northeast expansion of Owasippe ==
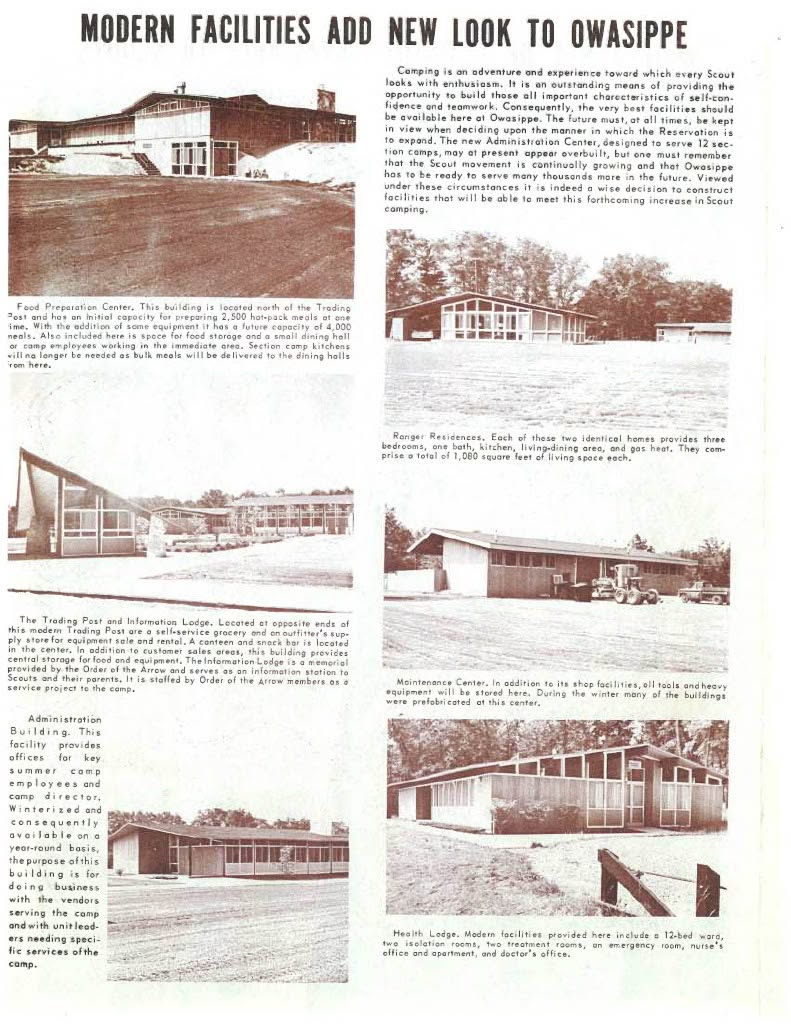
Modernized Facilities Promotional, 1965

After WWII and the baby boom, Scouting numbers grew at a record rate. Chicago Scouting saw membership boom with 51,521 Scouts in Chicago by 1960. This posed a problem for the Council in regards to Owasippe's capacities as there was only enough camping spaces for a maximum of 4,000 Scouts. With growing campership, and aging facilities at the original 3 Camps (Beard, Stuart, and West), Scouts were looking for new developments to be made. In a matching partnership with the Chicago Tribune, donations were made to the Council to fund the building of 3 new modern camps, and a Reservation Headquarters.

A study was conducted by the Chicago Area Council tracking the rate of rising membership and camp attendance at Owasippe in 1959. According to the study, it was expected campership would spike by 25% bringing attendance at Owasippe to an approximated estimate of 8,032 Scouts by 1962.

To accommodate projections, these facilities were secured through a major $3.8 million capital campaign with the Tribune (equivalent to $41.5 million today), led by R. Douglas Stuart in 1959. The Camp Capital Campaign was a massive undertaking that resulted in the opening of two new camps near Chicago; Camp Yorkville (changed to "Hoover Outdoor Education Center" in 1982) and Camp Crete as well as the expansion and modernization of Owasippe. Among the largest projects to come out of the campaign were Reneker, Wolverine North, Wolverine South, and the Administration "Ad" Center. Much of the land currently occupied by the Ad Center and Wolverine belonged to the Tribune to harvest trees for newspapers.

The first facility built during Owasippe's expansion was the Maintenance Lodge in 1963 housing vehicle mechanic pits, a workshop, and Headquarters for the Rangers.

New infrastructure was laid for water lines, a pumphouse, and electrical to the foundations of new structures. Owasippe controls its own water supply and well system.

As is often the case, the original vision for the campaign was much more ambitious. The Council proposed a total of 16 new section camps to be opened with seven to be opened by the end of the campaign. Only four of the seven were ultimately brought to fruition: Sauger Lake and Robert Crown, in addition to the aforementioned camps. The designs of most structures built at this time are generally the same across Sauger, Crown, Reneker, Wolverine, and Ad Center.

== Reorganization ==
In 1965, with the completion of the Ad Center, both Camp Wolverines and Family Camp, Owasippe was reorganized and rebranded from "Owasippe Scout Camps" as the "Owasippe Scout Reservation". At this point in time, Owasippe was operating several camps across vast acreage. Owasippe adopted a Reservation-style structure with Subcamp Directors managing their subcamps while reporting to a Reservation Administration led by the Reservation Director. The Reservation structure provided support and logistical staff that included clerical workers, Ad Center secretaries, Rangers, truck drivers, warehouse workers, and Food Prep cooks. In 1965 Reservation Staff surpassed 70 staff members.

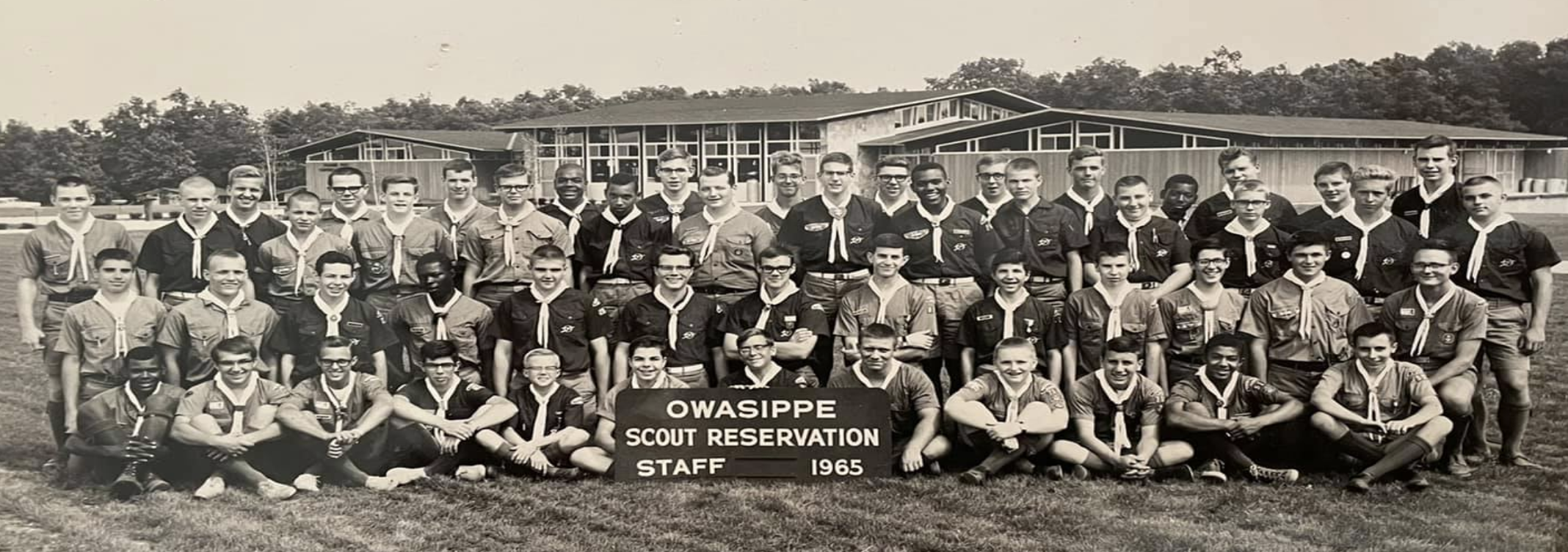
1965 Staff Photo taken in front of the recently completed Ad Center, Snackbar & Warehouse in background

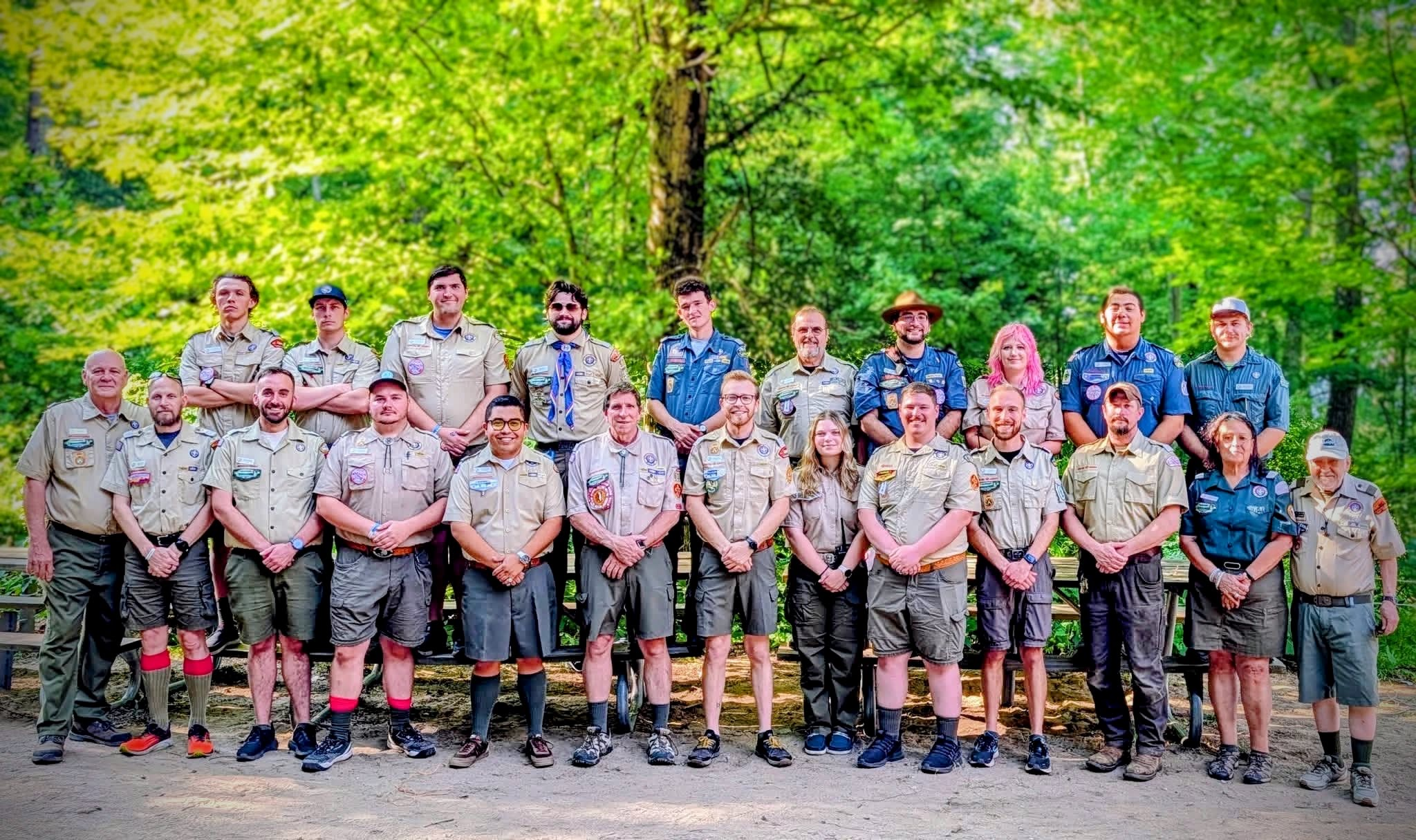
2026 Reservation Administration, Camp Directors, Rangers, and Support Staff

== Current active subcamps ==
=== Camp Blackhawk ===
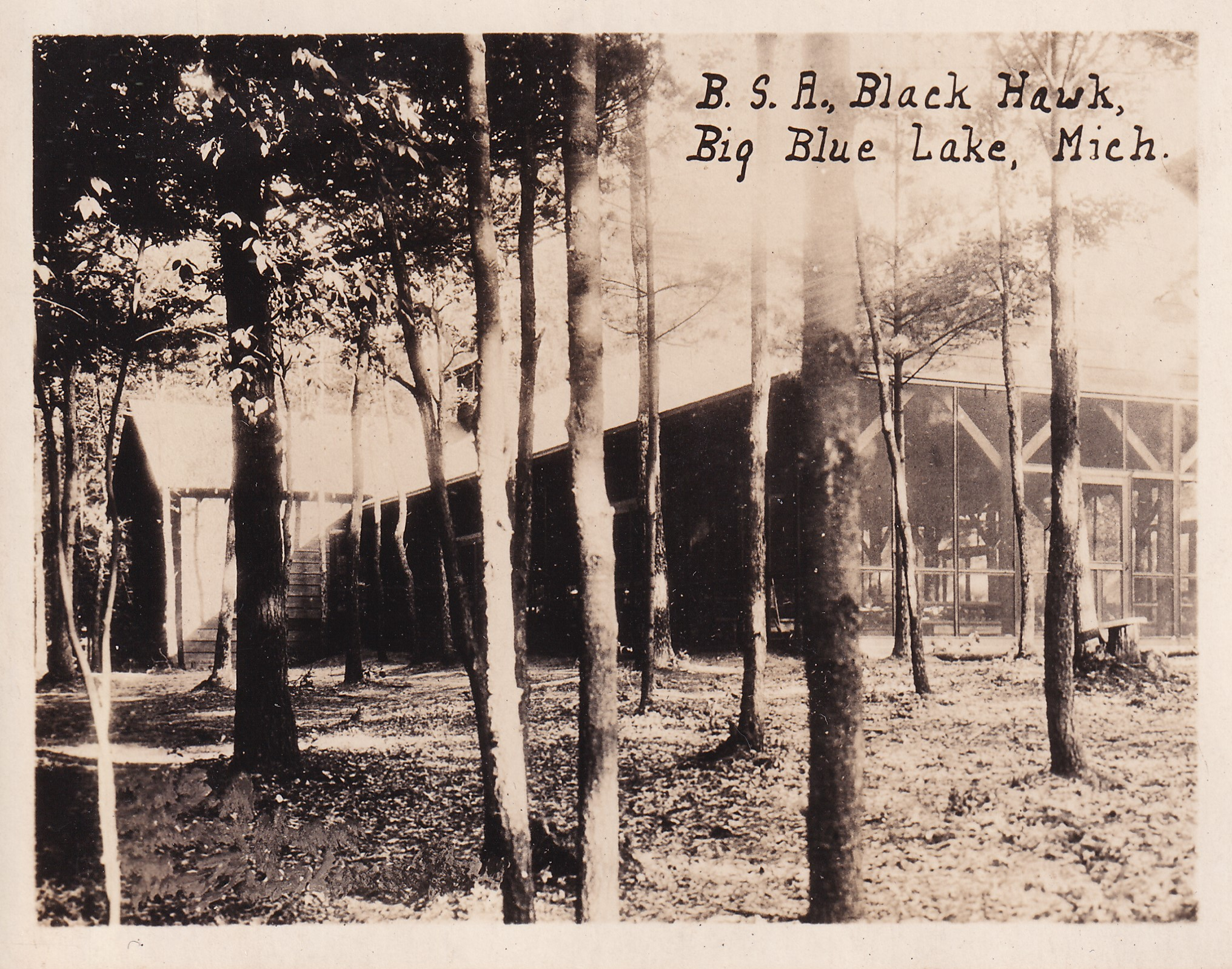
Blackhawk Dining Hall, Built 1926, Razed 1979

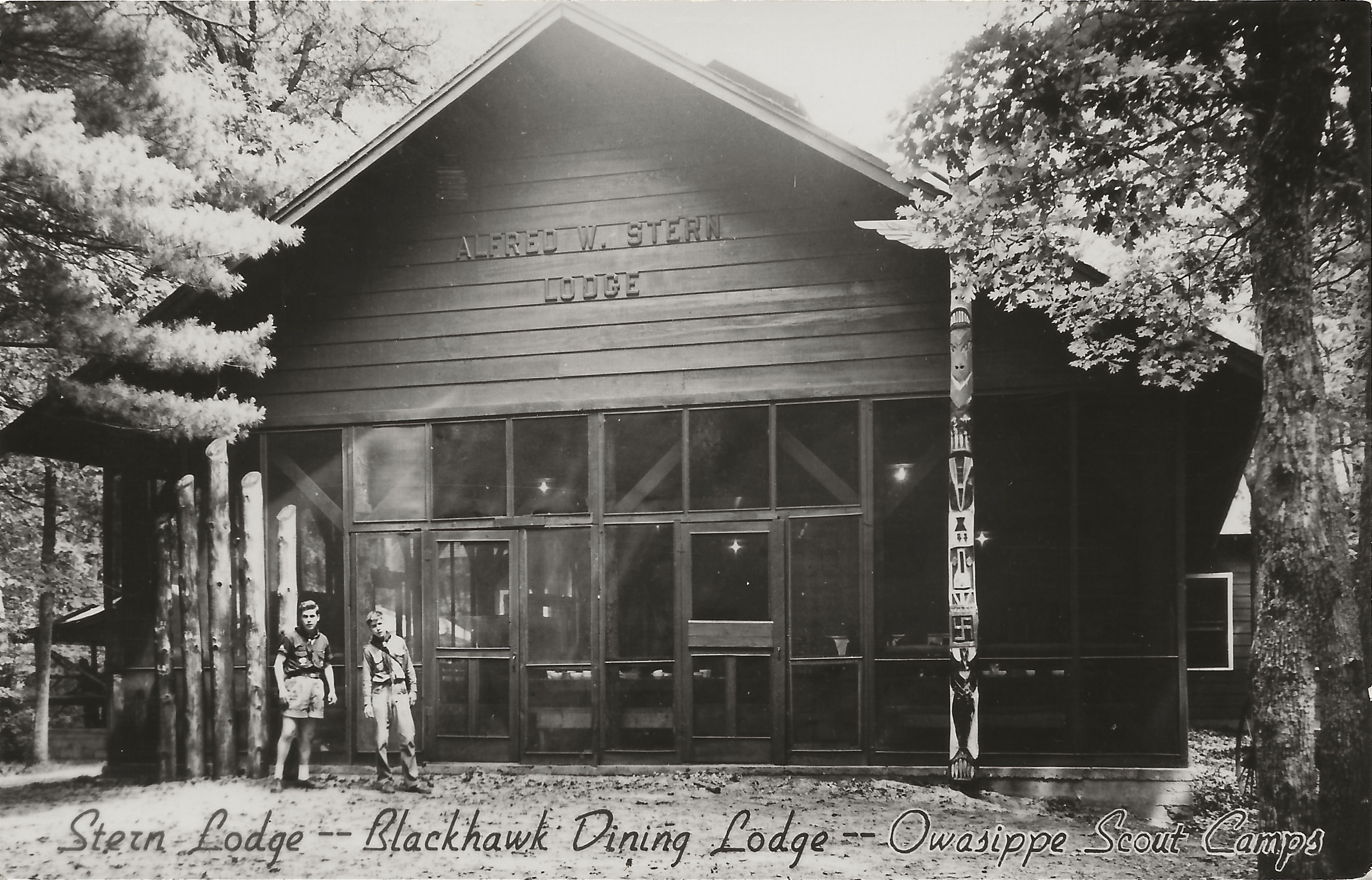
Front of Dining Hall

Opening a year before Camp Checagau, Camp Blackhawk was founded on the shores of Big Blue Lake, but was located about a mile east of its current location. Its first year of operation appears to have been in 1925, operating under the name "Pioneer". In 1926, it was opened with the name Blackhawk, but was closed during the Great Depression in 1932, though the land would be used occasionally for camping, under the name "Pioneer", as well as hosting the black-only troops of the Douglas Division under the name "Belnap". In 1949, it was reopened, and would remain at its original site until the new Blackhawk Dining Hall was built in 1980. The first incarnation of Blackhawk had its own dining hall (The Alfred Stern Lodge), which was built in 1926, and only has its foundation remaining. The first incarnation of Old Blackhawk had a nature cabin by the lake as well as a Sea-Scout-specific area. This area would become the normal waterfront area in the second incarnation. The first incarnation also had their campsites named after Native Americans, including the Menominee, Ottawa, and Sacs. The second seemed to keep a lot of the campsites the same, but instead of naming them after tribes, went to numbering them. The second incarnation had an Archery and Shotgun range to the south near its entrance, as well as Protestant and Catholic chapels on opposite sides of the camp. Both incarnations, however, seemed to share the same council ring, or Firebowl. This fire bowl is still in use as the current Blackhawk Firebowl.

Because of Lake Big Blue's size, Blackhawk's waterfront can host sailing, speedboats, and other motorboat options for those who want to go tubing, fishing, or even standup paddleboarding. Campers can also do a mile swim outside the lanes to an eagle's nest on the eastern side of the property. The camp also hosts a robust shooting program, with Black Powder, Rifle, Archery, and Shotgun Ranges. Like most other camps, it closes and ends the program every week with a big camp-wide fire. It has 18 sites, divided between 3 hills. These hills are named after old Owasippe camps that were located either on or around the area. Since 1980, Blackhawk has made continuous updates to its infrastructure. In 2006, a new craft pavilion was opened, replacing the old one. A new fire bowl was added on the site of the original. New Kybos have slowly been added, and a new staff shower house was opened in 2018. In recent years, several projects have been completed by volunteers and the Owasippe Staff Association to update roads, facilities, and bridges. In 2025, Blackhawk celebrated its 100th anniversary.

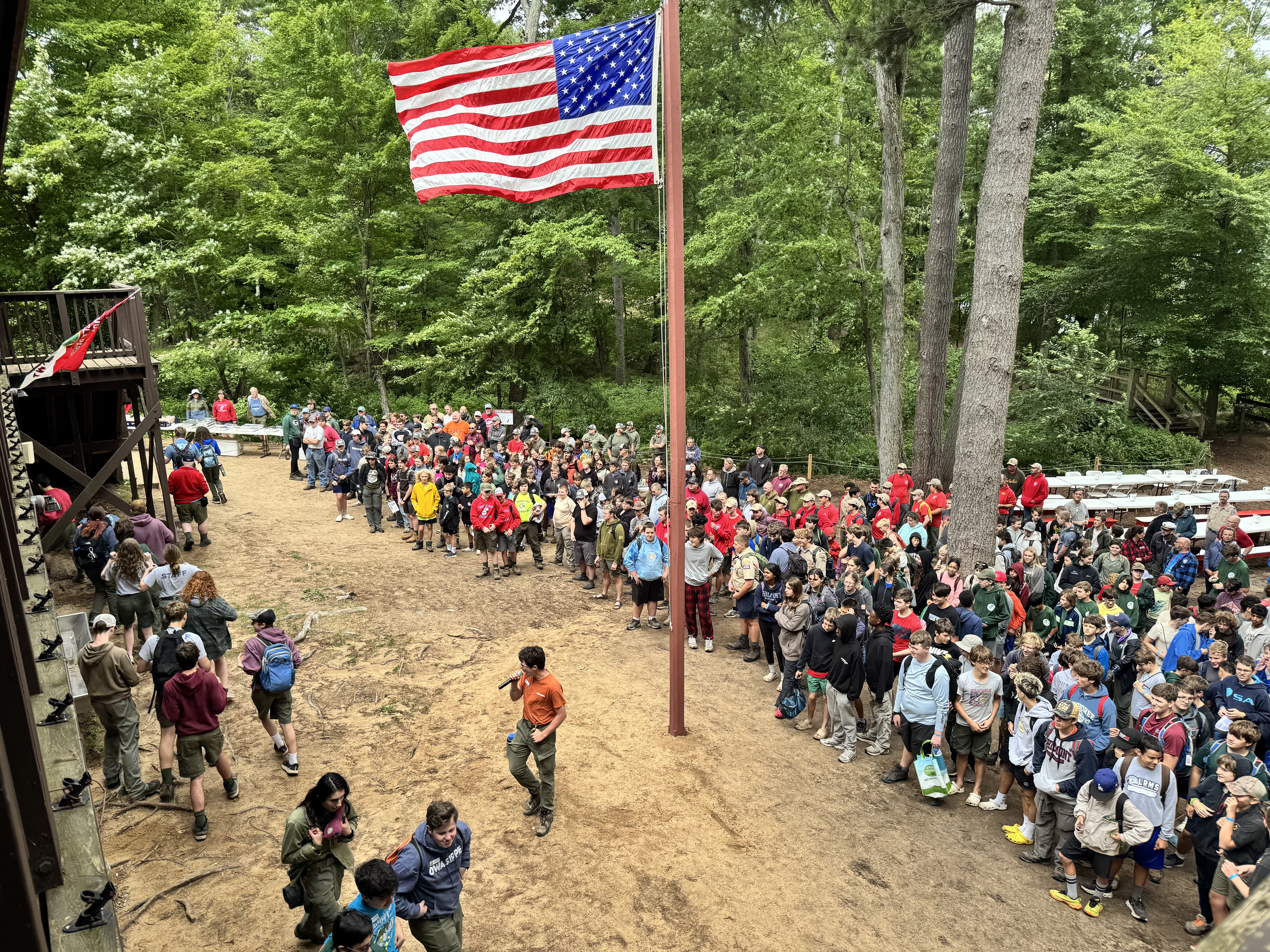
July 2025, Camp Blackhawk Staff and Campers outside of the Dining Hall for before lunch

=== Camp Wolverine ===
Camps Wolverine North and South were open from 1965 to 1979 and both were located on the site of modern-day Camp Wolverine. Before the Scouts owned that land, it belonged to the "Club Wolverine" group, which occupied the land starting in 1948. The Club was an outdoor fishing and hunting club that occupied the land around Cleveland Creek. The two camp wolverines were founded in 1965 as part of a major capital improvement plan to modernize Owasippe's facilities with Scouting numbers growing into the end of the 1950's and early 1960's. These camps, instead of having a Dining Hall, used what is called Hot Packs, wherein food was delivered via truck to each campsite in insulated capsules and containers. Both camps used a North/South Rivalry (in a sort of civil war style). Both North and South were outfitted with their own pools, staff, program areas, ranges, and 12 Campsites.

In 1980, to consolidate resources, the camps were merged into Camp Wolverine. The North Lodge and Pool were adpoted for main program use for the Camp Office and Aquatic area, as well as the North Boat docks for boating. The South docks were converted into the Ecology and Conservation program area. Furthermore the Wolverine South Firebowl converted it's use to serve as the Reservation's Order of the Arrow firebowl.

In recent years Owasippe has adapted Wolverine to changes in demand opening a central dining tent that troops may elect to utilize instead of patrol dining in the campsites with hot packs. In 2018, Owasippe shifted Cub Scout programming from Camp Carlen to Wolverine. Wolverine offers two half-sessions of Cub Scout camping for one week of the summer.

=== Camp Reneker ===
Owasippe has known several family camps over its history and previously noted, however with the capital campaign with the Tribune in the 1960's a goal was to erect a permanent family camp with modern accommodations for Scouting families. Opening in 1964 along Holton-Whitehall Road, "Family Camp" opened for its first season becoming the first of the camps of the NorthEast expansion to open. The camp hosted a pool, camp lodge & office, 40 individual cabins, 2 shower houses, playgrounds, and tennis and shuffleboard courts.

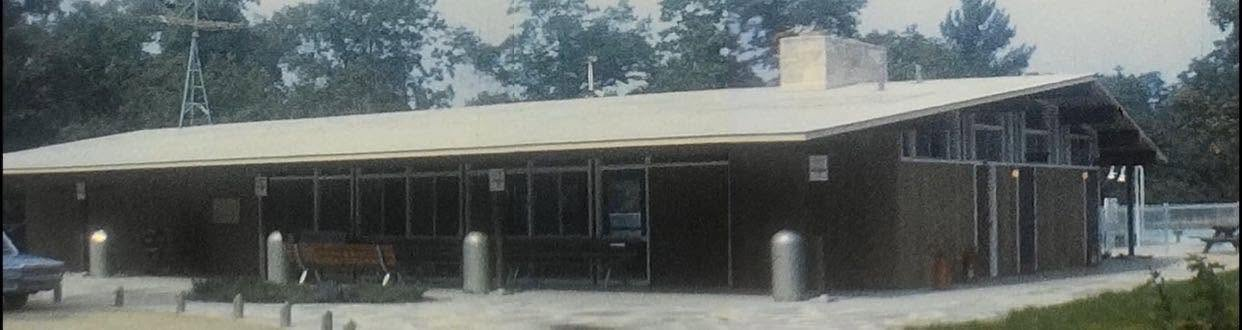
Camp Reneker Lodge

Family Camp is laid out in 2 grouped areas of cabins, "A Side" & "B Side", both having 20 cabins. Each cabin can sleep 4-6 people and has a small living room with a couch, a kitchenette and dining table, and 2 bedrooms with bunk beds. Originally plans for the camp had called for 2 more sides ("C" & "D" sides) to be built but as this was experimental, the infrastructure was laid, but they were never built before the end of the campaign.

In 1981 Family Camp was rededicated in honor of Robert W. Reneker as "Camp Reneker". Robert W. Reneker was chairman and Chief Executive Officer of Esmark, Inc. (formerly known as Swift & Company). Reneker was an accomplished Scouter and served as Chicago Area Council President from 1963 to 1964, and later became the National President of the Boy Scouts of America serving in that role from 1973 to 1975. Reneker, a 1943 alumnus of the University of Chicago Booth School of Business, also served as the Chairman of the Board of Trustees. During his tenure over CAC and Owasippe he oversaw the expansion and foundation of Family Camp in its current location.

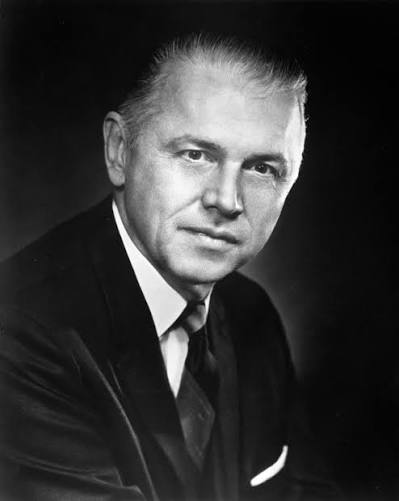
Robert W. Reneker

In 2001 the Reneker Lodge was lost as the result of a fire during the off-season. It was later determined by the ATF and Muskegon County Sheriff's Office that the fire was an arson. With the loss of the lodge the central area in camp next to the pool hosts a large tent for gathering flanked by two buildings housing the camp office and trading post. This area is used for general fellowship, meetings, crafts, movie nights, potluck, and various family activities.

Today, Reneker has a fully staffed program tailored to families and participants of all ages. One of the unique historical aspects of Camp Reneker is that it has been staffed primarily by women, going back to the 1960's. The staff have often been the siblings and daughters of staff in the Scout subcamps. Family Camp at Owasippe became one of the few places that young women and girls could get involved with Boy Scout camping at the time. To this day, many families still return to camp at Reneker year after year. Units attending Wolverine or Blackhawk often still have family members that stay at Reneker coinciding with the week the unit is in camp.

=== Camp Hiawatha Beach ===
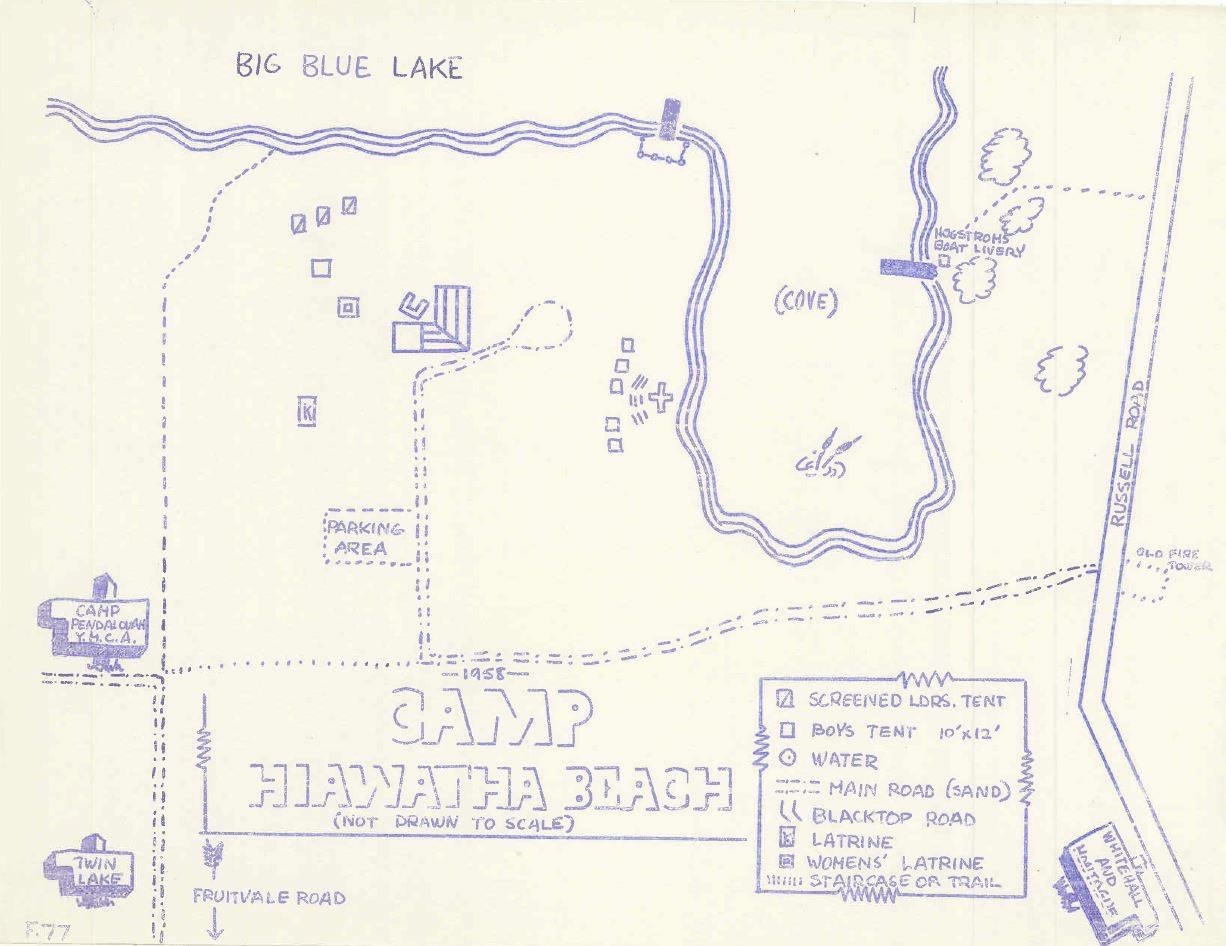
Hiawatha Beach, 1958

Opened in 1926, Hiawatha Beach is a lone troop camp, with individual troops camping there without any staff to run program. At some point in the 1920s, a small wooden cooking house was built, and some point after, an extension for seating was added. However, sometime after the 1960s, it was either torn down or burned. As of 2025, there is a water pump, a pit bathroom built around 1949, with some docks on Big Blue Lake.

Hiawatha Beach remains an option for units to reserve for summer and off-season use. The camp is commissioned and managed as part of the High Adventure Staff's responsibilities during the summer season.

== Inactive subcamps ==
This section is dedicated to camps that are still located within the modern borders of the reservation, and infrastructure is still intact, but are not operated regularly as subcamps. For former camps with land outside the current reservation borders, with no remaining infrastructure, founded after the original Owasippe Lake Camps, see Former Subcamps of Owasippe.

=== Camp Robert Crown ===
Opened in June 1971, the camp was named after Judge Robert Crown, it was similar to Wolverine in its construction. It was fully staffed like Wolverine and hosted hot pack meals, a central lodge, and a swimming pool. The lodge that currently stands is very similar to the one located at Carlen, and the pool is also quite similar. It remained open until the 3rd week of 1989 when it abruptly closed. Today, ATVs often take rides through Camp Crown, along with mountain bikes and nature hikes, and the area remains open for hiking.

=== Camp Carlen/Sauger Lake ===
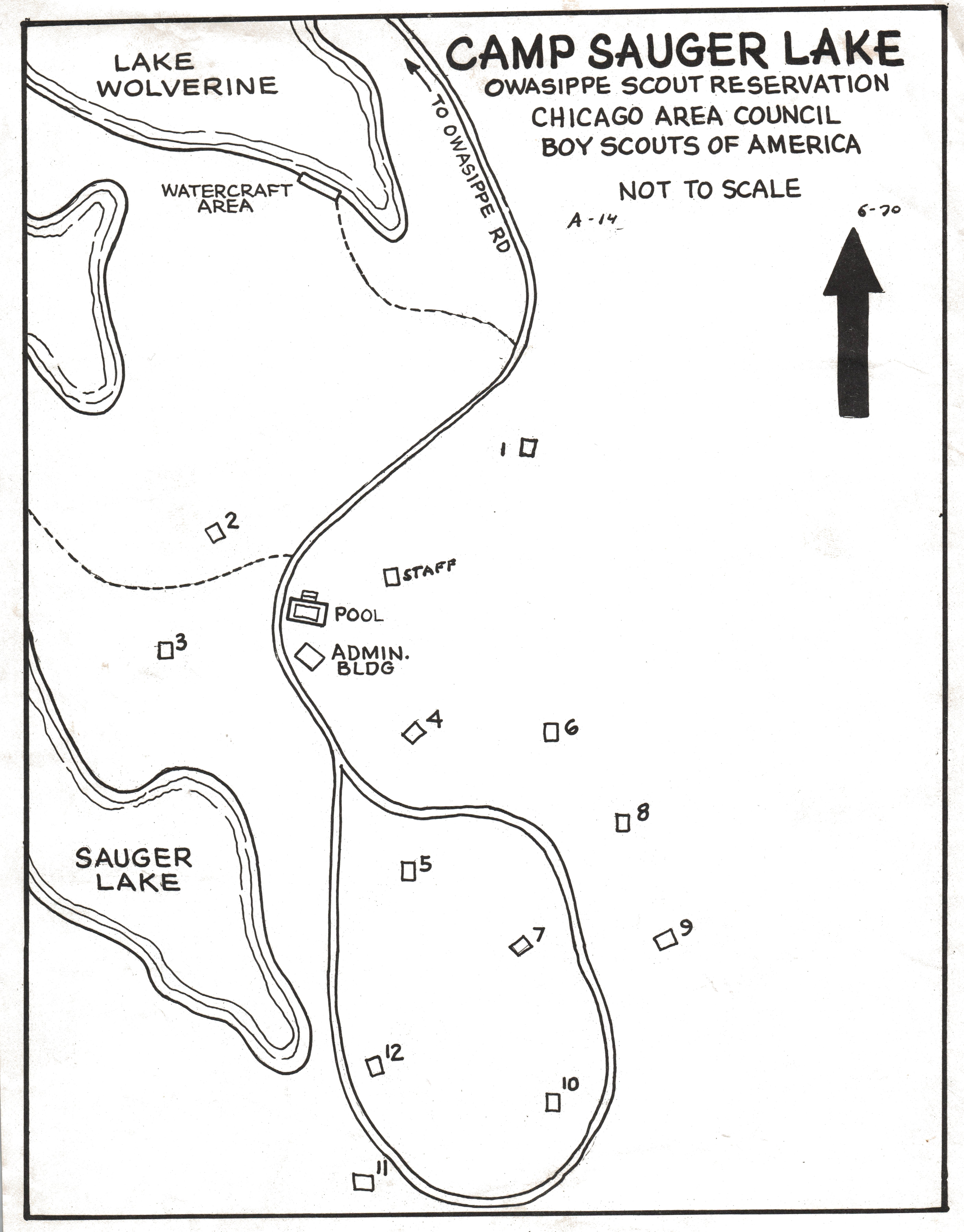
Camp Sauger Lake/Carlen Map

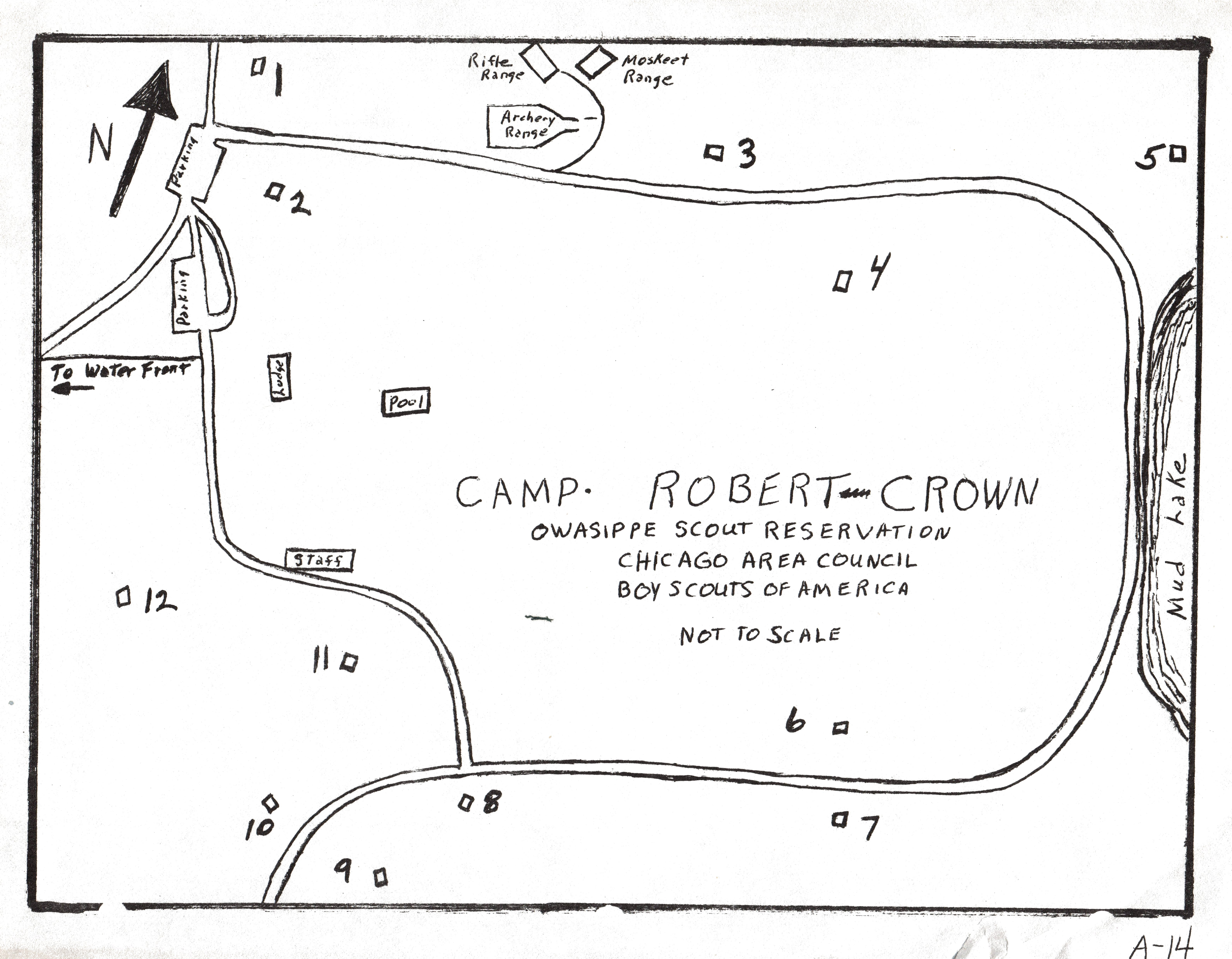
Camp Crown Map

Camp Sauger Lake was located between Lake Wolverine and Sauger Lake, and like Wolverine, the nature of the lakes made swimming difficult. As a result, a pool was constructed, similar to the one at Wolverine, in 1969, the year the camp opened. When it was first opened, it was a hot pack camp. When it first opened in 1969, maps show that its waterfront was located where Crown's waterfront now stands on Lake Wolverine. In 1983, the camp was renamed in honor of WWII Veteran and Chicago businessman Major Raymond Carlen. He was the manager of Joseph T. Ryerson & Son (later Inland Steel Company), a steel company that donated to the camp. Major Carlen was President of the Chicago Area Council from 1970 to 1974, and was chairman of its Board of Counselors in the early 1980s. Around this time, a Dining Hall was constructed, very similar to the one used at Blackhawk.

After being closed for several years in the mid-2000s, it reopened in 2009 as a Webelos camp, operating sporadically until 2017, before being closed. Currently, many High Adventure excursions (horseback, ATV, mountain biking) and Scout Troop treks take hikes through Carlen regularly.

=== Camp Bass Lake ===
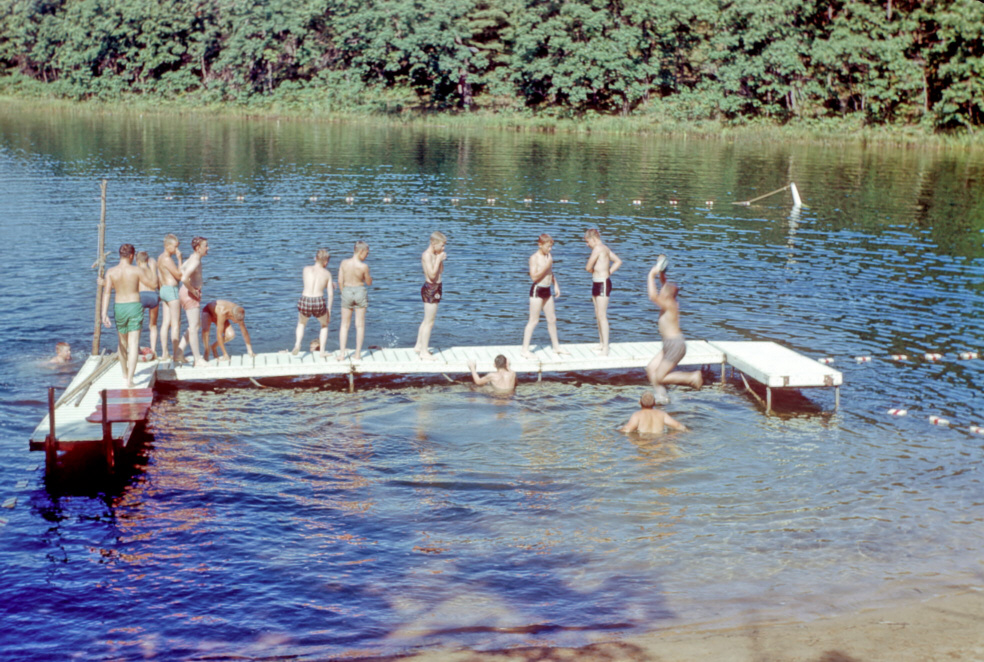
Camp Bass Lake swim area - 1959 - Troop 664.

The Bass Lake lone troop Scout camp was a single camp on a small (approximately 600 feet (180 m) wide) lake on the Owasippe reservation. A single troop would take over the entire camp, usually for a two-week period, preparing all their own food and overseeing all aspects of the camp life. While active in the 1950s and 1960s, Camp Bass Lake is no longer in use as a scout camp.

=== Camp Frontier ===
This was the name used for two camps different lone troop camps, one operating in the late 1960s and 1970s on the northern shore of Lake Wolverine, and the other being another lone troop camp that operated east of the new Blackhawk Firebowl in the 1980s, near what is now the Blackhawk Chapel.

A single troop would take over the entire camp, usually for a two-week period, preparing all their own food and overseeing all aspects of the camp. While active in the 1950s and 1960s, Camp Bass Lake is no longer in use as a scout camp. Camp Frontier remains nestled in the coves of Lake Wolverine with a KYBO still standing.

== Former subcamps ==
=== Camp Belnap ===
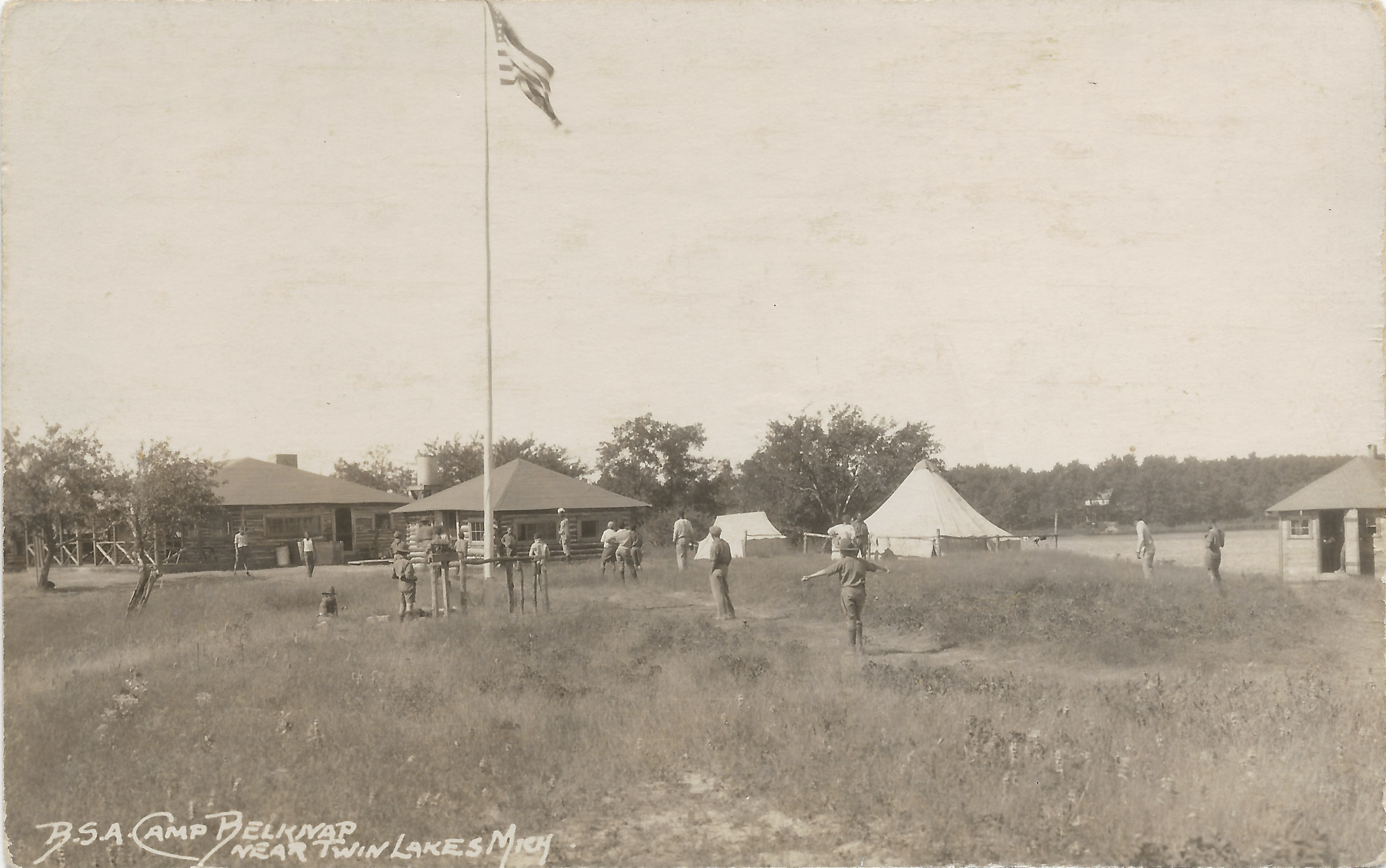
Camp Belnap in the 1920s.

Camp Belnap was the camp for the Black scouts of the Douglas Division, the segregated district for all of the Black Scouts in Chicago. In accordance with Michigan Law at the time, both Black and White people were required to have separate "but equal" facilities, though scouts of other ethnic backgrounds often camped at the white camps, such as Asians or Mexicans. A new camp was developed, far to the east of the current camp property, on a strip between Lake Watisee and Lake Ojibwe, called Camp Belnap. The names for these lakes have changed in the past 90 years, and the site is almost certainly the strip of land between Sweet Lake and John Adams lake.

The camp was developed in 1926, but the buildings themselves were erected several years prior by the previous owners of the property. While separate from the rest of the opportunities the Owasippe camps offered it, was by all accounts a good, functioning camp. It had Handicraft, Aquatics, Firebowl, Dining Hall, everything you would expect from a camp. However, in the following years, it became clear that the water table of Lake Ojibwe was rather fragile. If a bad drought came, one of the lakes would dry up. But before this could happen, the site on Lake Ojibwe was closed in 1932. Although the Great Depression impacted all families, it is worth noting that black families were hit especially hard by the Great Depression. As a result of this downturn, camp attendance, particularly Belnap's, dropped drastically. It was decided to abandon the land, and relocate black campers to Hiawatha Beach for several weeks set aside specifically for them. The Hiawatha Beach site was called "Camp Belnap" while black scouts camped there. Throughout the 1930s and 1940s, Belnap was held at various Big Blue Campsites, including Old Blackhawk (then called Pioneer) as well as the 248 Club.

By 1948, this segregation had ended, and Black scouts were free to camp at all Owasippe camps, with Camp Beard having its first black staff in 1955.

=== Camp Checagau ===
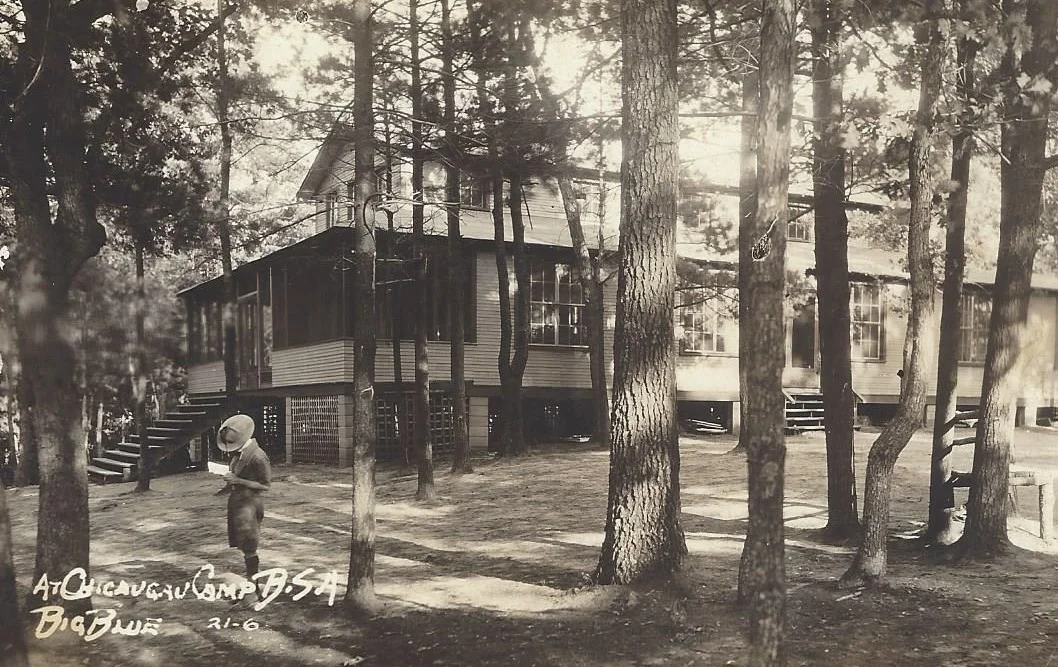
Dining hall at Camp Checagau

Camp Checagau was founded in 1926 on the south end of Lake Big Blue, east of where Old Blackhawk is today, not as is often stated, on the Checagau hill. However, unlike many of the other camps that were purpose-built for the scouts, Checagau was built using the buildings and structures of an old resort, called the Old Pointe Comfort Hotel. It was built in 1922 by Joe Meyers, and consisted of a building, about 40' by 80', and ten surrounding cottages, roughly 12' by 20'. It also likely had Tennis Courts and several other miscellaneous buildings on the property, as later maps of the camp show such features. It had initial success in its 1922 season, but it appears that it slowly lost popularity. By 1926, the land was bought by the scouts, and the hotel was repurposed into a camp. It is interesting to note that the name "Camp Checagau" was also used for camp previously used Northwest District of the Chicago Boy Scouts. This camp was located in the Cook County Forest Preserve, near Palatine, Illinois, and its founding date is disputed, either having been founded in 1922 or 1914.

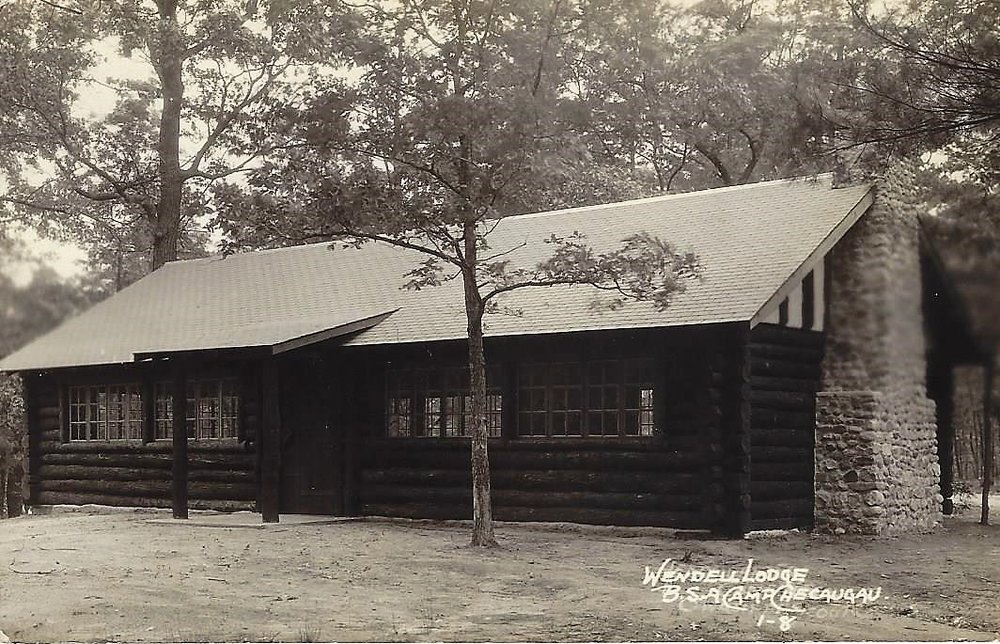
Barrettt Wendell Lodge

By 1926, however, Northwest District scouts were invited to camp at Owasippe, and opened reopened Checagau on land on the southeastern corner of Big Blue Lake, even further east than Old Blackhawk. Its first director was Alan Bryan. The dining hall was located where a house is currently, west of the dining hall was the Barrett Wendell Lodge. It was built in 1928, and its capstone is currently possessed by the E. Urner Goodman Museum. As of 2024, one remaining piece of physical history is a small foundation of crude, filled cinder blocks. This was at one point, a building called The hospital. East of the dining hall, there was also a small building which appeared to be the icehouse. Following the 1933 season, Camp Checagau closed, and the scouts of the Northwest District began camping at Camp Beard. The dining hall burned down in the winter of 1935, and the land remained a part of Owasippe, later becoming a family camp in 1949.

=== Big Blue Lake Hotel (248 Club) ===
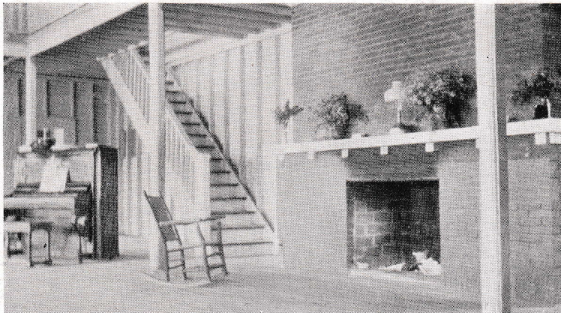
Interior of the hotel.

The 248 Club was a family camp on Big Blue Lake established by Scouts in the mid-1920s after acquiring a former hotel built in 1916 by the Fruitvale Resort Company during the Blue Lake Township resort boom. The hotel had operated as a resort throughout the 1910s and 1920s, while the Scout family camp appears to have functioned only intermittently despite retaining ownership of the property until the 1950s. The hotel was demolished by 1948, and the site was later sold to the county, which developed it into a public park and boat launch.

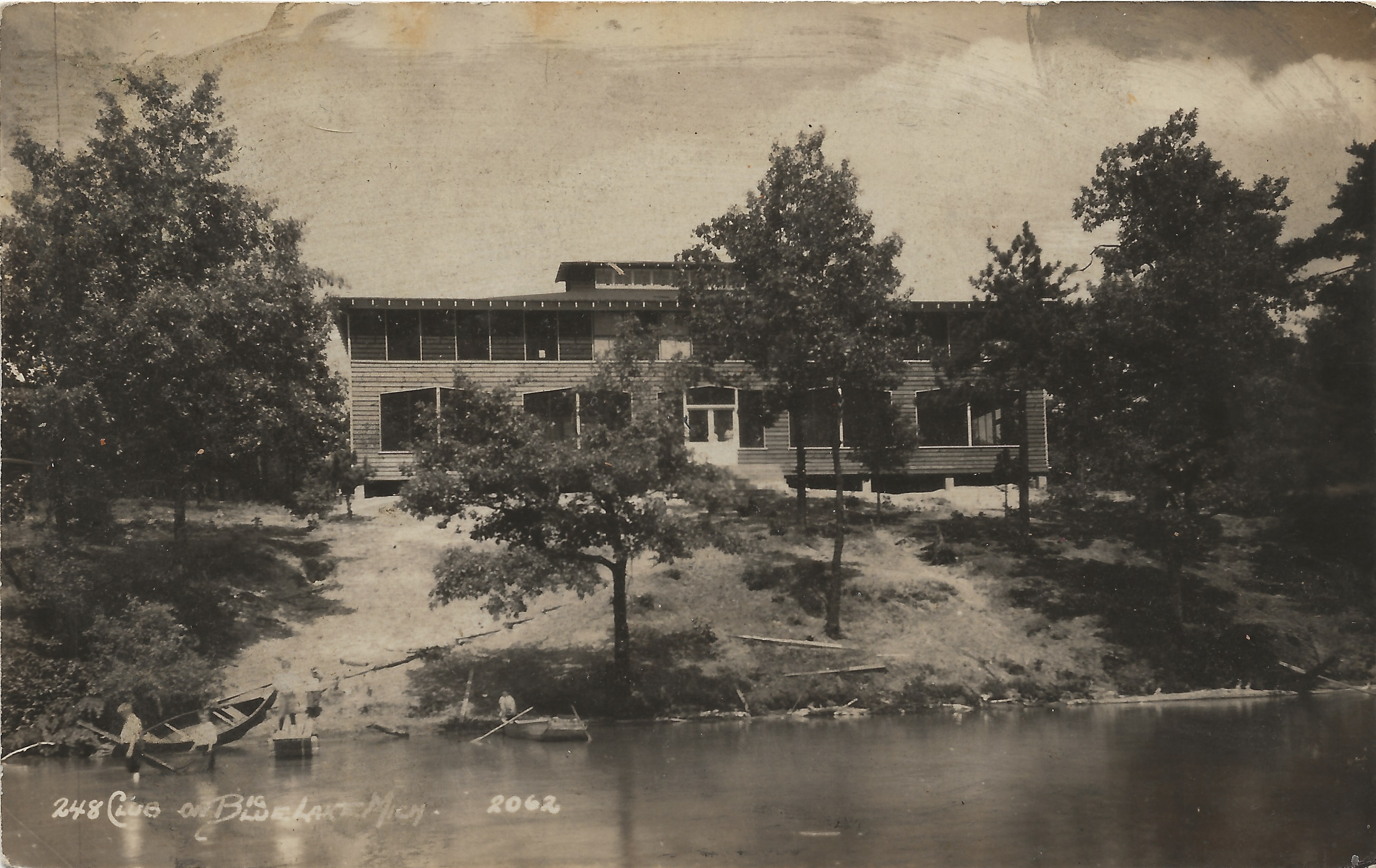
248 Club viewed from water.

=== Camp Wilderness ===
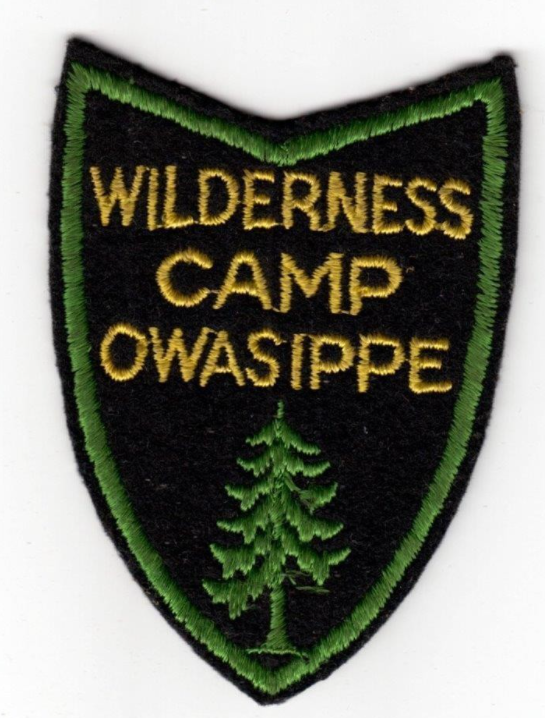
Camp Wilderness patch.

Camp Wilderness opened in 1937, on the current site of the Blackhawk Dining Hall. Prior to this, there were For this new location, the camp constructed patrol-sized Adirondack cabins, single hole Kybos (the remains of which are still visible around Blackhawk, such as at the top of Wilderness Hill and by the Sailing ) and a central lodge, cooking it in one of 5 small shelters. The waterfront was where the Blackhawk waterfront is now. Oftentimes, troops camped at Wilderness would either get unprepared food from the central trading post, called the factor cabin, Blackhawk Commissary, or they would receive hot packs. An Icehouse also existed, but burned down in the mid-1950s. According to a newspaper retrospective, the cabins were torn down in 1962. By 1967 the camp was still operating, though the sites just had tents, arranged in a ring around the Camp Wilderness lodge. Its last year of operation is not known.

Camp Wilderness
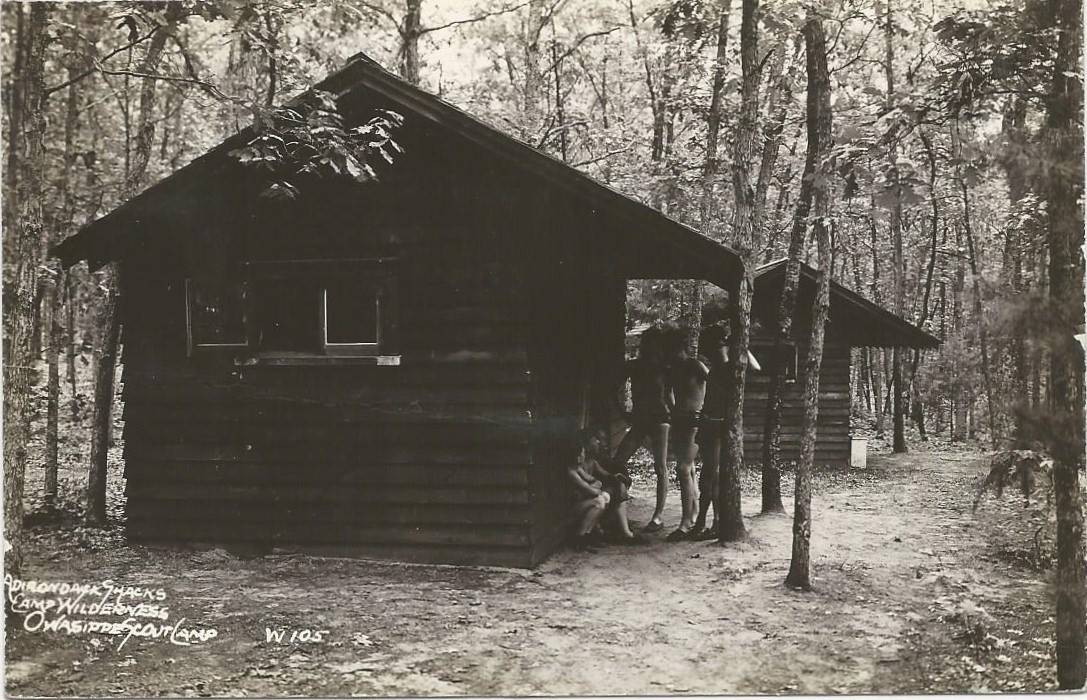
Adirondacks at Wilderness

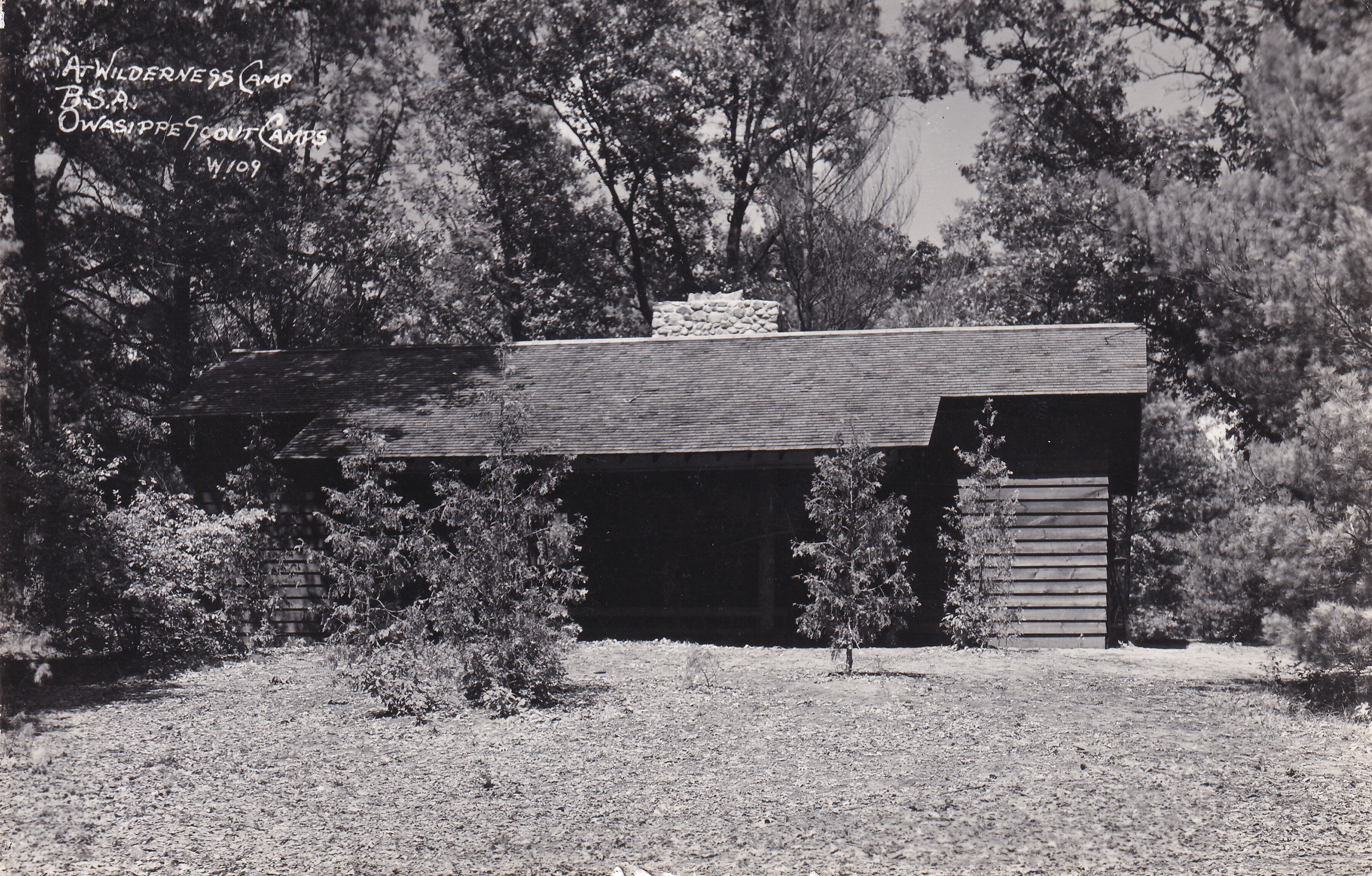
The Lodge at Camp Wilderness. It sits on the exact spot of the current Blackhawk Dining Hall.

=== Camp Pioneer ===
Camp Pioneer is one of the most confusing camps, because the name "Camp Pioneer" has been used to describe at least three different camps, working as more of a description of Lone Troop Camping, with the area changing around. The name is first used in 1925 to describe the new camp that Owasippe opened on Lake Big Blue, probably the site of New Blackhawk. Camp Pioneer was reopened on the site of Old Camp Blackhawk in 1937, with Wilderness opening that same year. It operated until 1949, when Blackhawk was reopened and new kybos were built. Afterwards, this Camp Pioneer was moved to the former site of 248 Club, until 1961 when it stops appearing on maps. However, the land was sold in 1958, so it was likely that the maps were either not updated, or were still used but the land was not owned by the scouts. It is likely that the name has been applied to different camps and their sites throughout Owasippe's history, including Hiawatha Beach, which makes a definitive list difficult. But these are the three most concrete examples.

To further confuse things, "Camp Pioneer" can also refer to older scouts or adults who work on developing the camps, such as building or fixing things, similar to the modern-day ranger. However, this terminology fell out of favor by the 1950s, if not earlier.

=== Blue Lake Family Camp ===
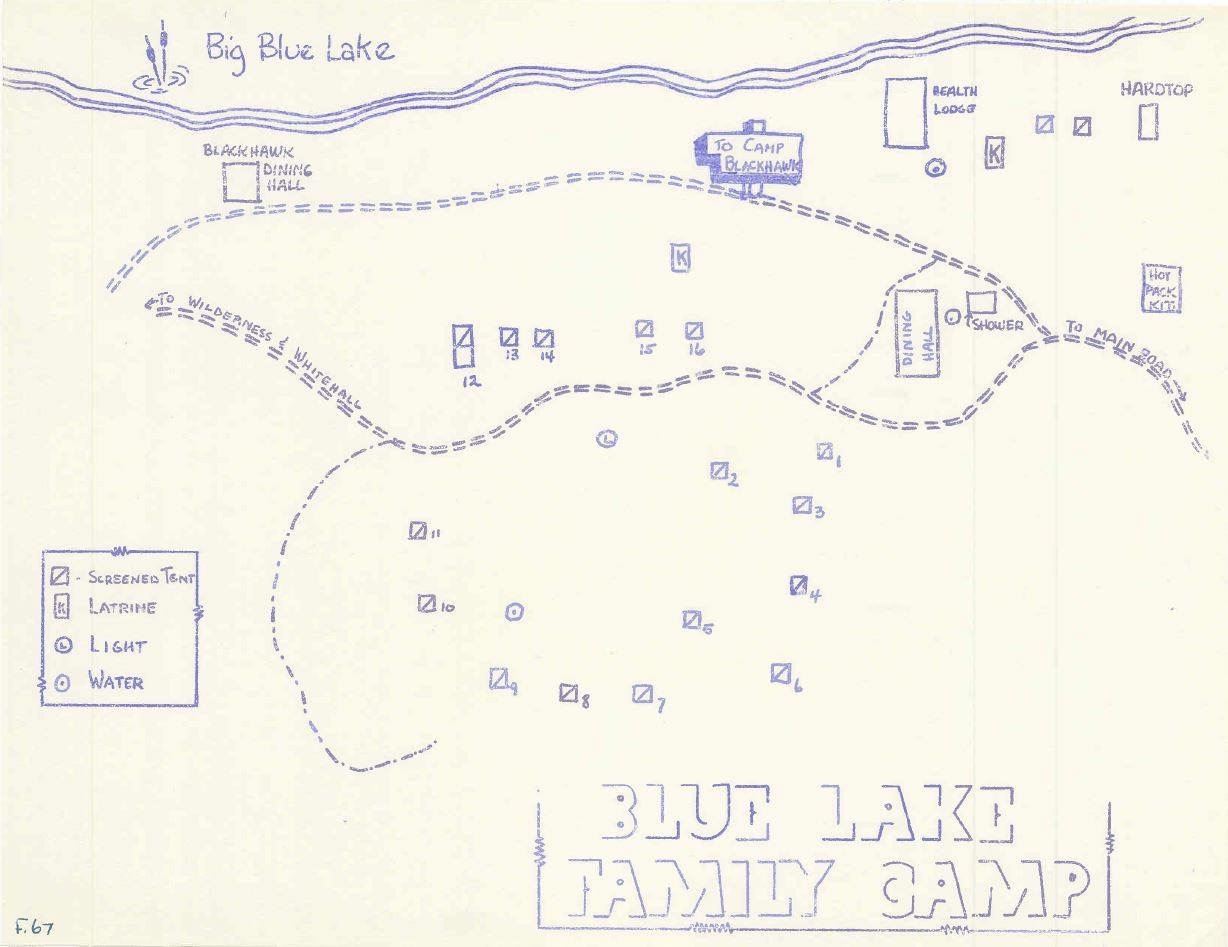
Blue Lake Family Camp Map, 1958

Following the immolation of the Checagau Dining Hall in 1936, Checagau's land appeared to have sat mostly unused until the demolition of the 248 club in 1948. The closure of the 248 club necessitated the need for a new family camp on Big Blue Lake, and it was decided to use the former Checagau land. The Barrett Wendell Lodge was used as a Dining Hall, and canvas-roofed cabins were used as housing for the campers. It operated until 1964, when Camp Reneker was built, rendering both the Blue Lake and Crystal Lake family camps obsolete. However, the land was used as part of Blackhawk in the 1970s, with the Hospital being reused as the Director's Cabin, and the general area being used as a Catholic Chapel. The land is partially owned by the scouts to this day, but a small section was sold in 1983.

== The Order of the Arrow at Owasippe ==
In the summer of 1915 young Camp Directors E. Urner Goodman and Col. Carrol Edson founded the "Wimachtendienk" (now the Order of the Arrow) at Treasure Island Scout Camp on the Delaware River. The organization was founded as an Honor-Camper program for older Scouts in camp to be recognized for their character and contributions by their fellow Scouts. It was modeled off of the ideas of Freemasonry, of which both of the founders were Master Masons. The experimental program began to spread to other camps throughout the country.

=== The Founders in Chicago ===
In 1920 Edson came to Chicago Council as the District Executive of the South Shore District of Chicago. During this time District Executives also served as Camp Directors at Owasippe. Edson was the founding Director at Camp West, serving as Director till his departure from Chicago in 1927. Edson also assisted in the founding of Camp Blackhawk with Mr. A. Carpenter in 1925. Naturally Edson decided to institute the OA program into his camp program at Owasippe and in Chicago Scouting forming a total of 5 Lodges within the Council. Edson initially brought the OA with him founding the 1st Chicago Lodge; Moqua #7. In the years to follow, 4 other lodges would be founded, each serving a particular district and a corresponding camp at Owasippe;

- Moqua Lodge #7 (Camp West)
- Wakay Lodge #13 (Camp Beard)
- Checaugau Lodge #21 (Camp Checaugau)
- Blackhawk Lodge #23 (Camp Blackhawk)
- Garrison Lodge #25 (Camp McDonald)

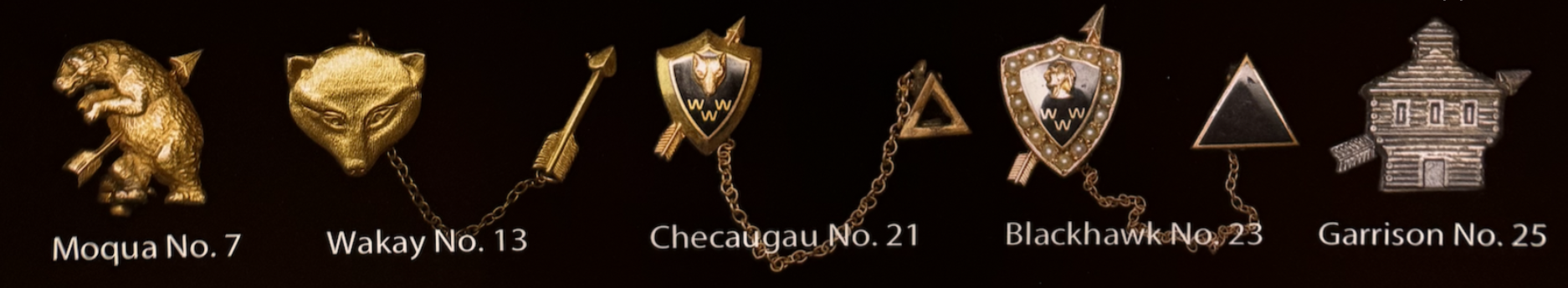
Predating Lodge Flaps, lodges had pins, these pins were from the original five Chicago OA Lodges. Pins courtesy of the National OA Archive

There was also later Takodah Lodge that was composed of members of the Douglas Division for African-American Scouters at Camp Belnap.

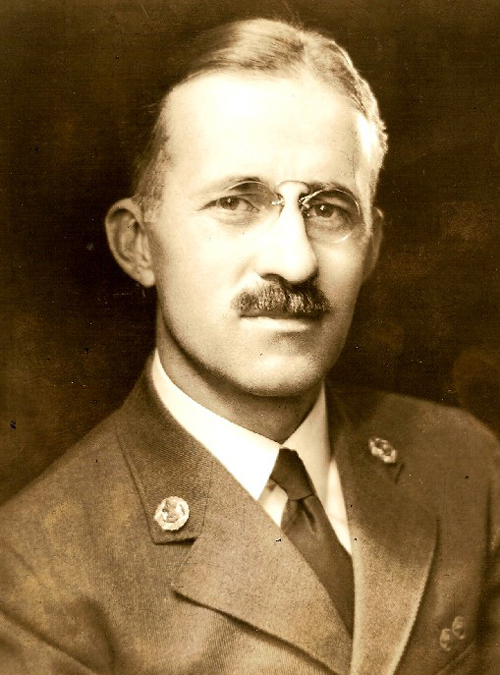
Chicago Scout Executive Goodman

On April 13, 1927 Goodman left Philadelphia joining Edson in Chicago having been appointed Council Executive of Chicago Council. This post was regarded as the largest and most important Scouting position in the country at the time. Upon arriving in Chicago and examining programs, Goodman determined that the lodges needed to be merged to have "1 Lodge, 1 Council".

During his time at Owasippe Goodman made several contributions, but none other more lasting than his writing of the Owasippe Hymn in 1929. Written on the shores of the Blackhawk Firebowl (which is still the current firebowl) the Hymn remains unchanged since and is sang weekly by Subcamps staffs across reservation to close out campfires. Goodman's original handwritten copy has been preserved and is on display in the Owasippe Museum at camp. It was written to the tune of the Cornell Alma Mater.

All the wealth of earth and heaven,
Bless thy woods and Dales.
Over all thy lakes and forests,
Happy youth prevails.

So may Scouting's bond of friendship,
Seal our loyalty,
To the camp so dear to memory,
Hail Owasippe!

Goodman remained in Chicago as Scout Executive and oversaw Owasippe till 1931. In reward for high performance, Goodman was promoted to the National Director of Program. He was replaced by Perry Lint as Scout Executive of Chicago. The Owasippe Museum currently located at the Administrative Campus is named in honor of Goodman.

=== Owasippe Lodge #7 ===
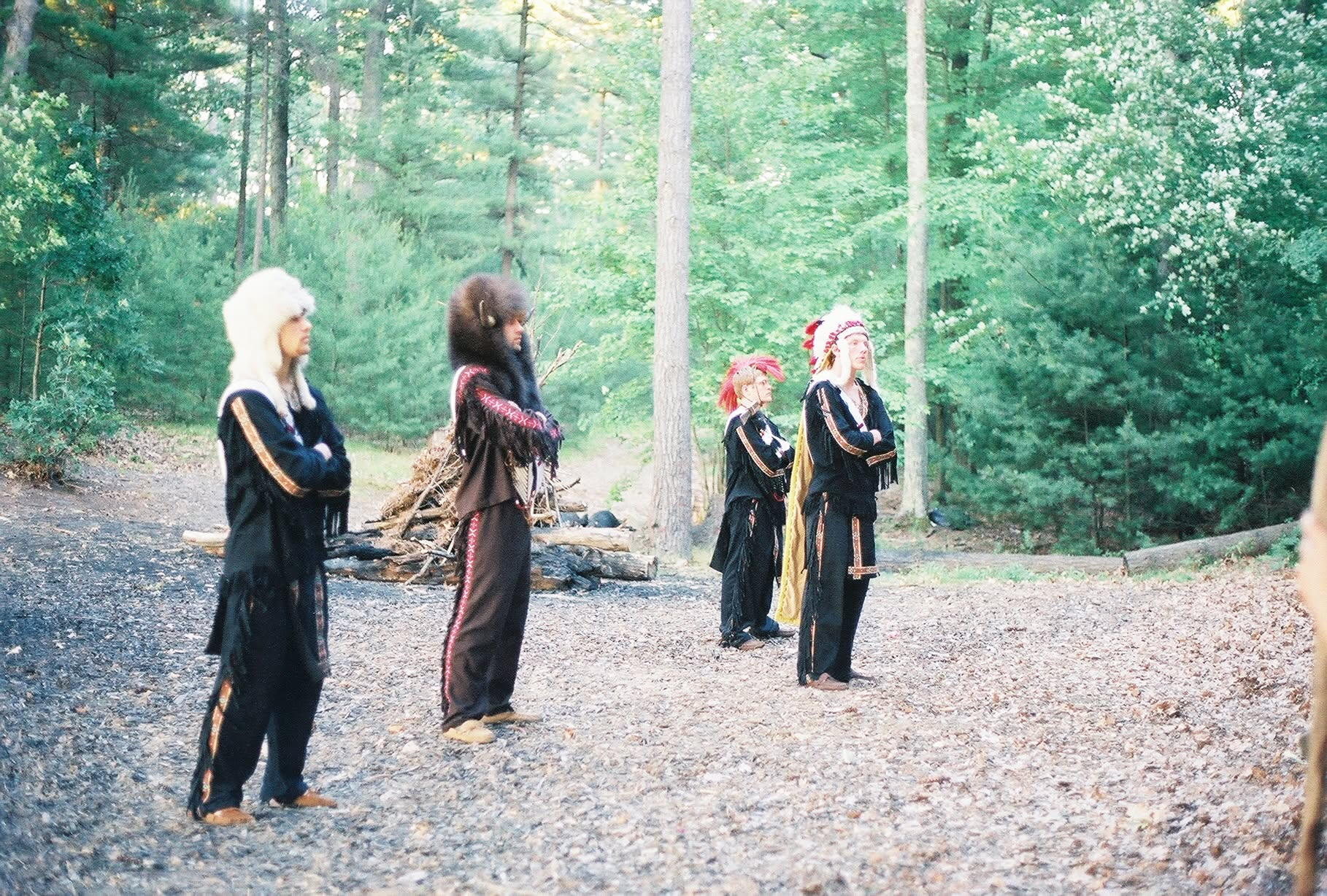
OA Callout at Camp Blackhawk, circa. 2005

Goodman's decision to merge the five Chicago Lodges took effect May 18, 1929 and the new lodge adopted the name "Owasippe Lodge". Many lodges around this time often adopted the name of the Council camp. With the merger Owasippe Lodge also adopted the lowest chartered number #7 from Moqua. In doing this Goodman set the standard for lodge mergers going forward nationally.

Owasippe's first Lodge Chief was George Mozealous.

The new totem selected to represent the lodge was "The Hand of Friendship". The 5 fingers are representative of the 5 original lodges that created the lodge at its merger. It is derived from Michelangelo's "Hand of Creation", and in relation to the OA a hand guiding the Arrow (mirroring the OA principles) straight and true.

Goodman maintained strong relationships with friends in Chicago and Owasippe Lodge till his passing in 1980. Goodman attended the Lodge Banquet in 1976 as the special guest.

Owasippe Lodge is also the home of the 1961 National Chief Ronald J. Temple. Temple to date is the only African-American National OA Chief. Temple also served on Owasippe staff as the Camp Blackhawk Director in 1967.

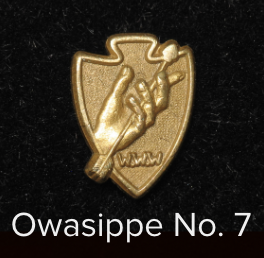
Owasippe Lodge Pin, "The Hand of Friendship"

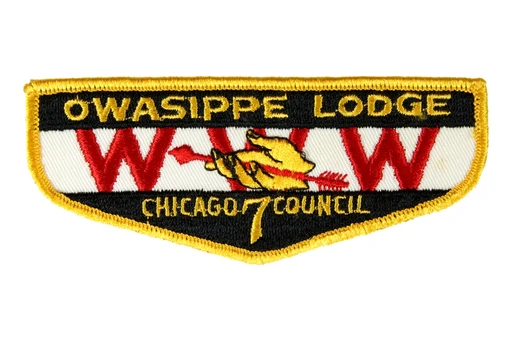
Early Owasippe Lodge Flap, pre 1965, post 1965 flaps said "Chicago Area Council"

=== 10th Grand Lodge Meeting at Owasippe - 1933 ===
From the Founding of the OA at Treasure Island in 1915 till this point in time the "Wimachtendienk" as it was known as a separate entity and was not an official Scouting program. On September 7–10 of 1933, 252 Chiefs and representatives of 23 lodges around the country convened at Owasippe for the 10th National meeting of the Order. Included in the meeting was members of Owasippe's Takodah Chapter, making this the first ever racially integrated National Event.

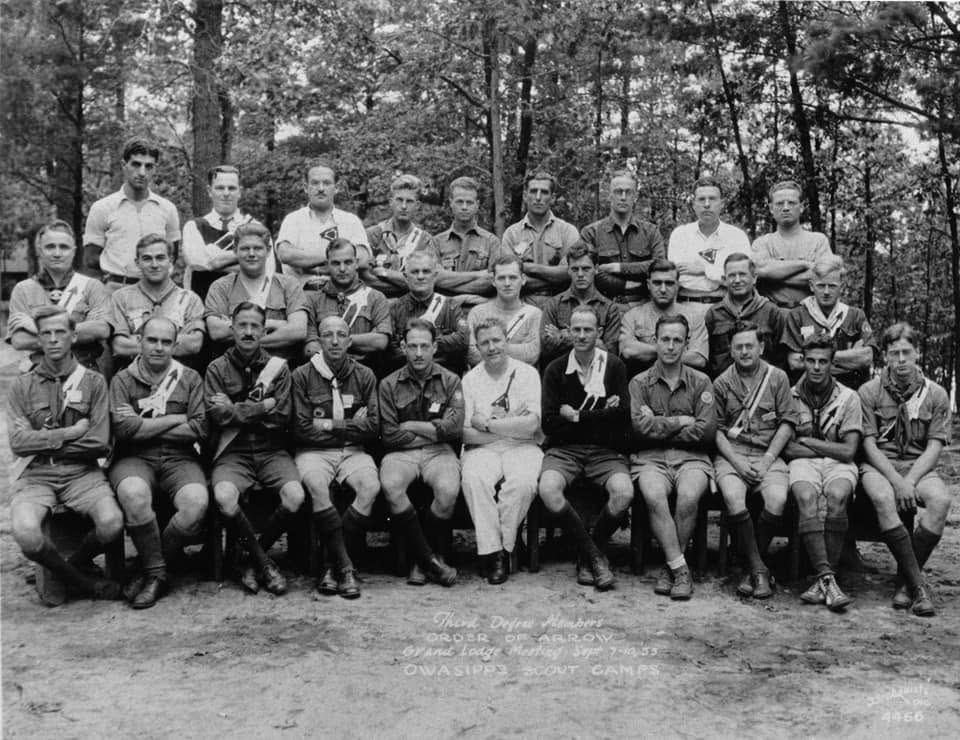
10th Grand Lodge Meeting September 7–10, 1933 at Owasippe Scout Camps, Vigil Honor (3rd Degree) Members in attendance. E. Urner Goodman seated bottom Row, third from Left

It was at this meeting held at Owasippe that a vote was held and the decision was made, in partnership with the National Boy Scouts of America, to make the OA an official part of the Scouting program.

=== Lodge Mergers of 2019 and Takhone Lodge #7 ===
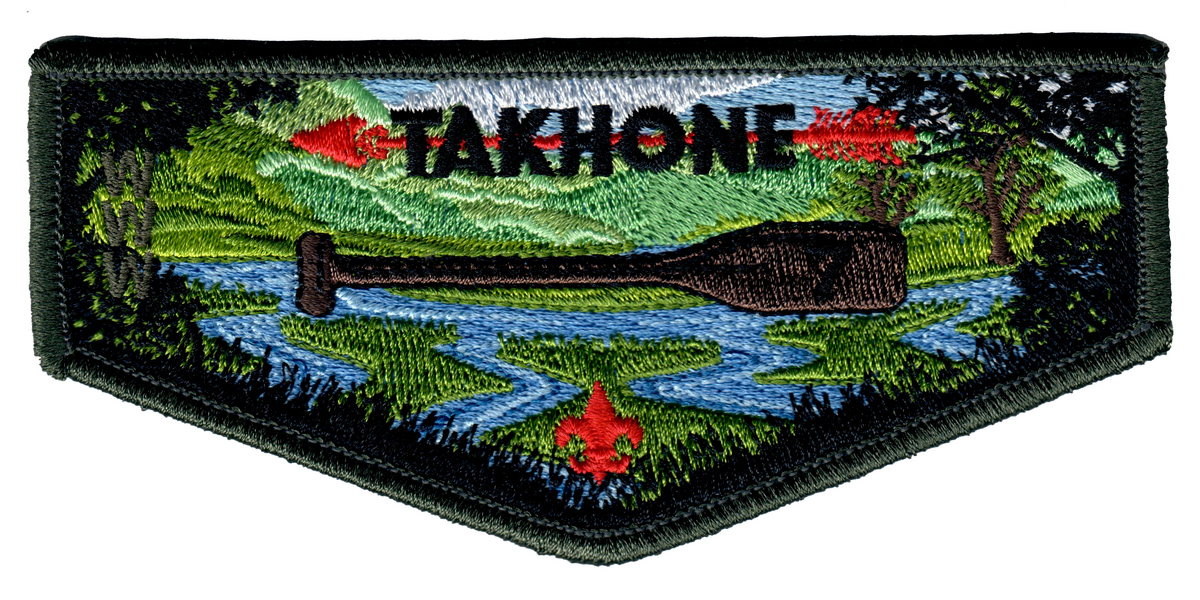
Takhone Lodge Standard Flap

In 2015 the four Chicagoland Scout councils merged to create the Pathway to Adventure Council. As a result of this merger the council now hosted four OA Lodges;

- Owasippe Lodge #7 (Chicago Area Council)
- Michigamea Lodge #110 (Calumet Council)
- Lakota Lodge #175 (Northwest Suburban Council)
- Pachsegink Lodge #246 (DesPlaines Valley Council)

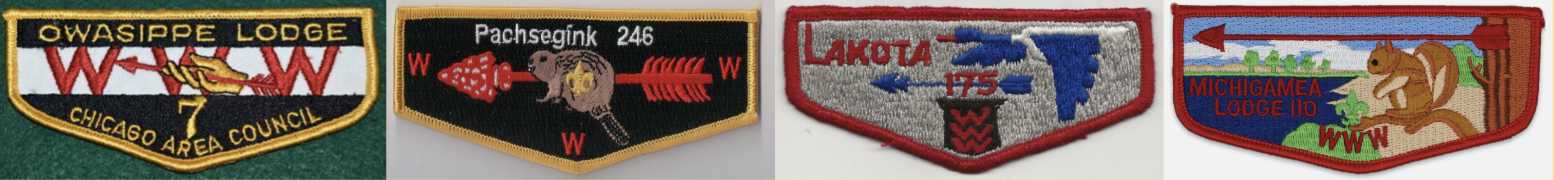
The Lodge Flaps of the four PTAC merging Lodges in 2019

After a reasonable amount of time after the council merge, and following the standard set by Goodman, the lodges began merger processes in 2017. The name "Takhone" was selected and the oldest charter number was once again adopted from Moqua, passing from Owasippe Lodge. In preparation for the new lodge a Lodge Executive Committee had to be formed. On August 12, 2018 the first election was held for Takhone Lodge #7.

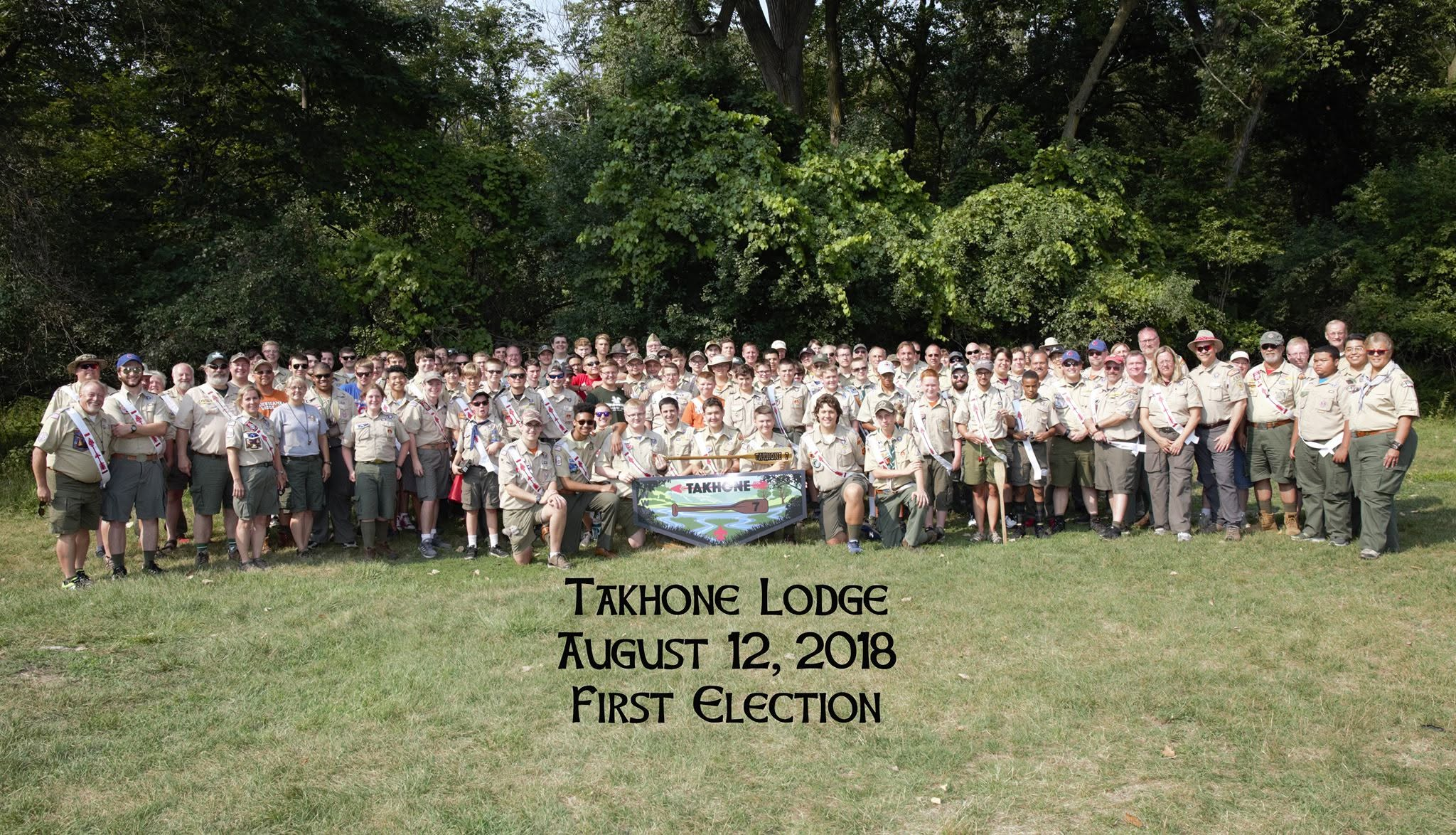
Takhone Lodge #7 First Election, August 12, 2018

The first term officers served half-terms from January 1, 2019 when the merge took effect till June 1, 2019 in order to set a standard annual election cycle for the Lodge every spring. The first Chief elected was Timothy J. Reiss, who originally served as the last Chief of Lakota Lodge. Reiss was later elected in 2022 to serve as the National Chief of the Order of the Arrow.

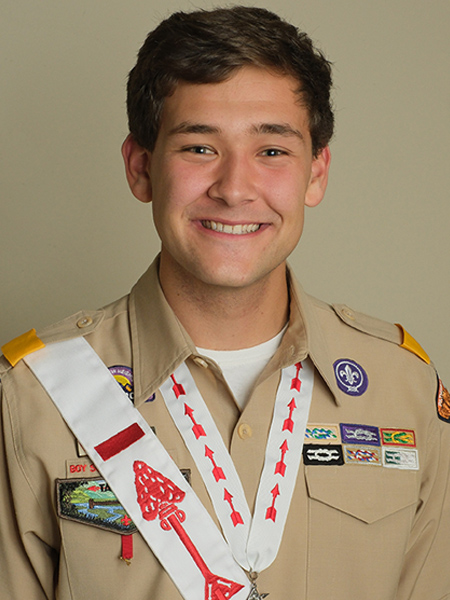
Timothy Reiss, First Takhone Lodge Chief and 2022 National OA Chief. 2024 Recipient of the Distinguished Service Award

Currently Takhone has a lodge membership of 1,400 Arrowmen as of 2026. Takhone provides camp service to both Owasippe and Betz through several events and fellowships hosted at both properties. Lodge members also serve on camp staff at both camps.

The Lodge provides OA summer programs at Owasippe in both Wolverine and Blackhawk conducting service projects and events for OA socials welcoming members of other lodges in camp as well. The lodge also provides Brotherhood opportunities while at camp.

Outside of general camp service, the lodge also donates to camp every year in the form of program equipment or infrustructure donations. The lodge also stands as the service corps arm of the bi-annual Council Camporee.

== Owasippe Leadership ==
Owasippe Leadership
	Name	Title	Tenure	Notes
1	Major Harry Hunt Simmons	Superintendent	1911	
2	Major Ronald W. Teeter	Superintendent	1912 - 1913	
3	Louis Love McDonald	Superintendent	1914	First season renamed as "Owasippe Scout Camps"
4	James P. Fitch	Campmaster	1915 - 1916	
5	Victor C. Sweinhart	Campmaster	1917	
6	Paul B. Sampson	Director	1918 - 1919	1st Term
7	Orton L. Duggan	Director	1920	
8	Walter H. "Pop" Gunn	Director	1921	
9	George Blaine Stephenson	Director	1922 - 1923	Also Chicago Scout Executive
10	Herman Mayhew	Director	1924	
11	E. Urner Goodman	Director	1925	Chicago Scout Executive 1927 - 1931
12	Paul B. Sampson	Director	1926 - 1927	2nd Term
13	Hansen W. Haun	Director	1928	
14	Alfred C. Nichols Jr.	Chief Camp Director	1929 - 1937	Example
15	Victor LeRoy Alm	Director	1938 - 1939	
16	George A. Mozealous	Director	1940 - 1942	First Lodge Chief of Owasippe Lodge, 1929
17	Victor Roy Alm	Director	1943 - 1944	2nd Term
18	Jack Conley	Director	1945 - 1946	1st Term
19	John "Jack" Perz	Director	1946 - 1950	Also Council Director of Camping
20	Victor Roy Alm	Director	1950	2nd Term
21	Jack Conley	Director	1951 - 1952	2nd Term
22	Edgar David Mickelsen	Director	1953 - 1958	
23	Joseph Anglim	Director	1959 - 1960	
24	Donald E. Rylander	Director	1961 - 1963	
25	Joe Davis	Director	1964	
26	Ralph Spaulding	Reservation Director	1965 - 1966	In 1965 Owasippe was reorganized and renamed the "Owasippe Scout Reservation".
27	David F. Lefeber	Reservation Director	1976 - 1969	1st Term
28	Charles Largent	Reservation Director	1970	
29	David F. Lefeber	Reservation Director	1971	2nd Term
30	Edward P. Black	Reservation Director	1972 - 1978	Also Council Director of Camping
31	James Chandler	Reservation Director	1979 - 1983	Also Council Director of Camping
32	Robert F. Poole	Reservation Director	1984 - 1985	
33	William P. Morrison	Reservation Director	1986	
34	Gerald J. Sanders	Reservation Director	1987 - 1989	
35	Steve Horvath	Reservation Director	1990 - 1991	
36	Paul Perkins	Reservation Director	1992 - 1994	
37	Jerry Lutz & Bill Schaefer	Co-Reservation Directors	1995	Only year of Co-Directors
38	Bill Schaefer	Reservation Director	1996 - 1998	Continued service from 1995 as sole RD
39	Pat Monahan	Reservation Director	1999	
40	Bill Van Berschot	Reservation Director	2000	1st Term
41	Steve Adams	Reservation Director	2001	1st Term. Also Council Director of Support Service
42	Bill Van Berschot	Reservation Director	2002 - 2004	2nd Term
43	Greg Lange	Reservation Director	2005 - 2007	
44	Christian Townsend	Reservation Director	2008 - 2013	Also Council Professional
45	Sean Haneberg	Reservation Director	2014	
46	Raymond Gawne	Reservation Director	2015	First RD under new Pathway to Adventure Council
47	Steve Adams	Reservation Director	2016	2nd Term; Adams retired during Staff Week, was replaced by Associate RD Patrick Romcoe for remainder of the season
48	Anna Montes	Reservation Director	2017	First Female Reservation Director
49	Terry J. Dutton	Reservation Director	2018 - 2020	Also Council Director of Camping
50	Nicholas Chavarria	Reservation Director	2021 - 2024	
51	Dalton B. DeVries	Reservation Director	2025–Present	Also Council Director of Camping

== The Owasippe Legend ==
According to local legend, Chief Owasippe's sons disappeared during a coming-of-age journey. Owasippe died awaiting them. Their remains were later reportedly discovered nearby, inspiring the camp's name and enduring traditions. In 1885, "The Whitehall Forum" published a story about some boys who unearthed indigenous burials and artefacts near Cemetery Point, including weapons, silver ornaments and a copper kettle, believed over a century old.

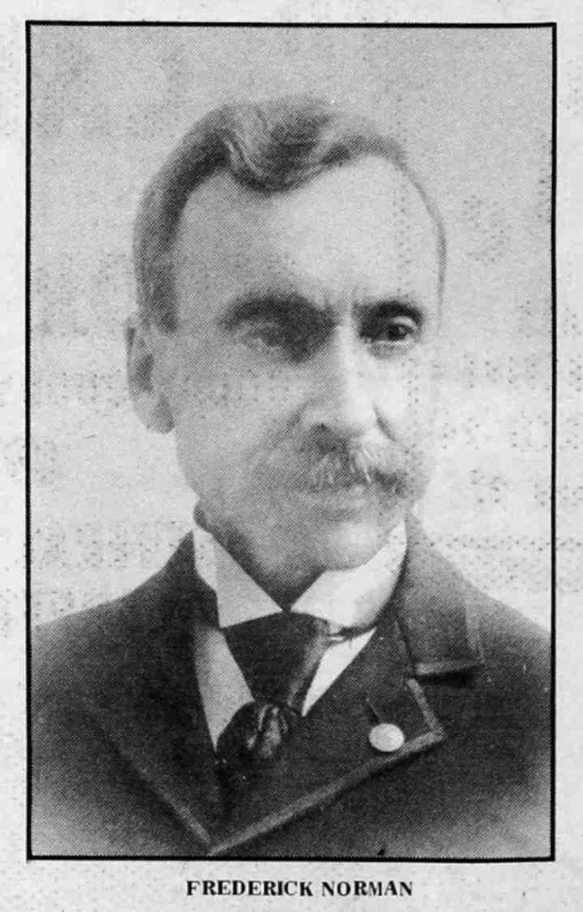
Frederick Norman

In 1898, Frederick Norman submitted a legend called "An Aboriginal Spot" for the book "White Lake Reminiscences." The legend he submitted is quite similar to the currently used legend of Owasippe. However, the name Owasippe is never used in writing until after the Boy Scout Camp is named. Frederick Norman's daughter, Bernice Norman, later added that a Native American named John Stone recited the legend to her father. Bernice Norman claimed that her father did a good deed for John Stone during the civil war and Stone recited the legend for Frederick Norman in return.

O-wa-sip-pe was one of the most beloved of old Chieftains, and many are the stories of his career. In one of their war expeditions, two young sons of Chief O-wa-sip-pe led the war party against their enemies, but the battle was against them and they never returned. The great loss grieved the old Chief so much that he died of a broken heart. For a long time, the name 'Deadman's Rollway' had been a mystery of the country. Not until 1887 was to even those who had spent all or nearly all of their life in this part the mystery solved to the entire satisfaction of those who made this part of the country their permanent home. As this time several young boys were spending the day fishing off of the point, which was a favorite fishing grounds, when they discovered the skeleton of a canoe. They returned to Whitehall, and reported their find to the people. A group of citizens, of which I was one, went up the river and after search found the skeletons of two canoes, and the skeletons of two men, along with a copper kettle, arrow heads, and beads. I had some of the beads and arrow heads until they were lost in the Whitehall Fire.

Mr. Reed then went on to tell the story of Owasippe and his two sons:

On this locality there lived and old Indian Chief, Owasippe IV or V, by name, who had two sons, the apple of his eye, and the favorites of the tribe. They were known as Big Bear and Little Bear, being named after the constellations in out heavens. Now as you probably know, it was the custom of the Indians to send their young men upon an ordeal when they reached the age of manhood. So Chief Owasippe called his tribe together for a farewell council fire. The sons danced for the people and the tribesmen in their turn, honored their young princes. The old Chief gave them good advice, and warned them of their dangers, whereupon the boys left for their journey down White River, into White Lake and into Lake Michigan. They were to return upon the second night.

On the afternoon of the second day, a dreadful storm broke forth, one of the most severe the country has ever known, and the sons did not return at the appointed time. The Chief became anxious. Every morning and evening, he went to the crest of the hill and watched the land of the setting sun. It became later, that he spent all of his time upon the lookout, and one day his people found him dead at his post under a pine, looking out over the country he had ruled.

The sons never returned, although the Chief has send out scouts and runners, and what became of them was never known until the people found the canoes at Burying Ground Point.

The supplement was that the sons were returning and were just off of the Point, when the storm overtook them. They landed and turning their canoes over for shelter, went to sleep underneath. During the night a landslide buried the princes, and they were never heard of until the river washed the sand from off their resting places. The Chief was buried at his Lookout, between two pines, as was the Indian custom.

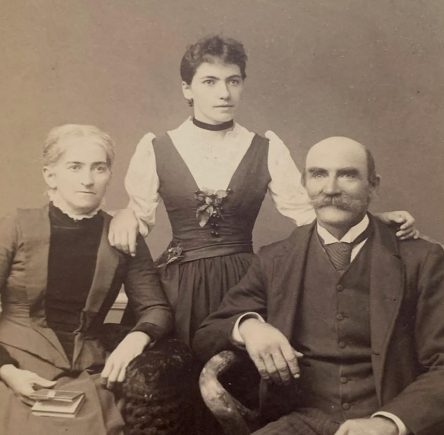
John O. Reed contributor to Owasippe Legend and claimed to be among the individuals who discovered the remains of the Natives near Burying Ground Point

=== Other Owasippe Legends ===
==== "The Indian Legend of White Lake the Beautiful" by John O. Reed ====
This legend is about the author's father who settles in a wilderness area in Michigan and establishes a trading post. The man recalls an afternoon where he played near a spring with a young Native named Deerfoot and the old Sachem Owasippe. The old chieftain told the two boys a legend about a wise and good Sachem who ruled over all the Indians in the territory and was able to effect a peaceable settlement between two hostile tribes. When the old warrior passed away, his body was placed in a canoe and set adrift on a river, which eventually led to a lake. The Indians were startled to see the sky filled with white and silver winged birds, which they saw as the Great Manitou's white winged angels guiding the old chieftain to his final resting place. The canoe drifted to the shore near the old chieftain's wigwam, where the body was buried with great reverence, and the lake has since been known as "White Lake—The Beautiful."

== Recent events ==
- Beginning in 2018, with the help of the Owasippe Staff Association, the reservation has updated various facilities to accommodate the influx of girls into scouting, including various new shower houses at Camp Blackhawk, and updating Camp Wolverine's Pool facilities.
- In 2022, to accommodate the recent new campers following the closure of Camp Napowan, an extra week was added at the beginning of the summer.
- On July 16, 2025, a 15-year-old camp counselor died from drowning. The unconscious body was recovered from Big Blue Lake by a search and rescue team.
- On July 23, 2026, an 11-year-old camper was killed when a tree fell on him. Deputies said the camper was walking through a trail when a tree fell, hitting him. The child died of his injuries, according to the sheriff's office.

== Sources ==
- Meyers, Paul (2012). Owasippe the Camp And other Chicago Council Camps The Early Years 1912-1961. p. 43.
