= Log Cabin syrup =

Brand of table syrup

The logo of Log Cabin

Log Cabin is an American brand of pre-packaged table syrups owned by Conagra Brands.

== Brand history ==
Log Cabin syrup was introduced in 1887. Grocer Patrick J. Towle (1835-1912), initially formulated as a way to dispose of left over corn syrup. He named the resulting product in honor of his childhood hero, Abraham Lincoln, who was famed for having been raised in a log cabin.

== Acquisitions ==
The brand was acquired by General Foods in 1927, and it remained one of that company's major brands for decades, General Foods merged with Kraft in 1990, and Kraft General Foods sold the Log Cabin brand to Aurora Foods in 1997. Under Aurora's ownership, Log Cabin partnered with the National Park Service to restore some historic log cabins. But after Aurora Foods went bankrupt, Pinnacle Foods acquired it in March 2004. Conagra Brands acquired Pinnacle Foods in June 2018.

== Marketing ==
In the 1970s the product was endorsed on television commercials by singer Eddy Arnold. The newest version of Log Cabin syrup has eliminated high-fructose corn syrup, believed by some to increase the risk of obesity. It is the first American brand to eliminate the ingredient, though it stills contain corn syrup - with the exception of the brown rice syrup-based “All Natural table syrup” variety.

== See also ==
- List of syrups
- Pancakes
- Waffles
