= Table syrup =

Artificial syrup used on pancakes and waffles

- Alternative names: Pancake syrup, waffle syrup
- Type: Syrup
- Place of origin: United States
- Ingredients generally used: Corn syrup, high-fructose corn syrup or cane sugar, water, coloring, flavoring, and preservatives

Table syrup, also known as pancake syrup and waffle syrup, is a syrup used as a topping on pancakes, waffles, and french toast, often as an alternative to maple syrup, although more viscous typically. It is typically made by combining corn syrup with either cane sugar or high-fructose corn syrup, water, food coloring, flavoring, and preservatives.

Table syrups were introduced in the late 19th century to fill the desire for maple syrup of Americans moving into urban areas. After World War II, major brands like Aunt Jemima and Mrs. Butterworth's were introduced with little actual maple syrup.

== Naming ==
In the United States, table syrups can be sold under a name consisting of any word followed by the word syrup with the exception of maple, cane, and sorghum. Commonly used names are table syrup, pancake syrup, waffle syrup, and pancake and waffle syrup.

== History ==
In the late 19th century, as Americans moved into urban areas, they brought with them demand for the taste of the maple tree that they were accustomed to. To capitalize on this, table syrups were made to emulate the taste and look of maple syrup. This was achieved by adding decoctions of maple wood, hickory, or corn cobs, and by giving them a brown color mimicking that of maple syrup by boiling brown sugar. By the beginning of the 1900s, the amount of Vermont maple syrup being sold was ten times the actual production.

Frustration with these misleading products helped bring about the Pure Food and Drug Act, which set out to ban mislabelled foods. Following this, products like Mapleine and Log Cabin branded themselves as maple syrup alternatives that used science and research to produce a superior flavor.

After World War II, products backed by large corporations like Quaker Oats' Aunt Jemima and Unilever's Mrs. Butterworth's were introduced. These products only contained trace amounts of actual maple syrup.

== Production ==
Table syrups are primarily made from other syrups combined with water, coloring, flavoring, and preservatives. The syrups most often used to create table syrup are corn syrup and high-fructose corn syrup. Some brands such as Log Cabin syrup use rice syrup. Despite serving as an alternative to maple syrup, modern table syrups often do not have any maple syrup content.

Major brands of table syrup include Pearl Milling Company, formerly Aunt Jemima; Mrs. Butterworth's; and Log Cabin.

== Usage ==
Table syrups are often used as a cheaper alternative to maple syrup, with, as of 2015, prices of table syrup, $2 per litre ($8 per US gallon), being 5-8 times lower than those of maple syrup, $11–$16 per litre ($40–$60 per US gallon).

In a 2015 survey by The Washington Post it was found that 70% of Americans prefer using artificial syrups on their pancakes compared to real maple syrup largely in part due to its cheaper price. Maple syrup production is also limited to the Northeastern United States, giving Americans outside of that region less exposure to maple syrup. Compared to the complex maple flavor of maple syrup, table syrups are said to be singularly sweet with little complexity and noticeable artificial flavors.
