= Pearl Milling Company =

Brand of pancake mix, syrup, and other breakfast foods

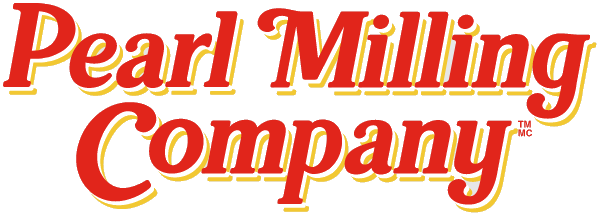
- Formerly: List: Pearl Milling Company (1888–1890); R.T. Davis Milling Company (1890–1914); Aunt Jemima Mills Co. (1914–1926)
- Type: Privately held company (1888–1926); Subsidiary (1926–2001)
- Industry: food industry
- Founded: 1888; 138 years ago in St. Joseph, Missouri
- Founder: Chris L. Rutt; Charles G. Underwood
- Defunct: 2001 (company, the brand remains)
- Fate: Company defunct, became a brand
- Headquarters: St. Joseph, Missouri, United States
- Area served: U.S., Canada
- Products: Pancake mix, syrup, breakfast foods
- Brands: Aunt Jemima (1888–1926) (Note: Owned the brand until the company was acquired by Quaker in 1926.)
- Owner: PepsiCo (2001–present)
- Parent: Quaker Oats Company (1926–2001)
- Website: pearlmillingcompany.com

Pearl Milling Company is an American brand of pancake mix, table syrup, and other breakfast food products owned by PepsiCo. The brand is named after the former manufacturing company that produced the original version of the pancake mix product. The Pearl Milling Company was founded in 1888 by Chris L. Rutt and Charles G. Underwood. The original version of the pancake mix was developed in 1888–1889, and was advertised as the first "ready-mix" cooking product. To distinguish the pancake mix, Rutt and Underwood branded it under the Aunt Jemima name. They then sold the company in 1890, and its ownership changed hands until it was purchased by the Quaker Oats Company in 1926, which, in turn, was bought by PepsiCo in 2001. In 2021, the Aunt Jemima brand name was discontinued, with all products rebranded to "Pearl Milling Company".

== History ==
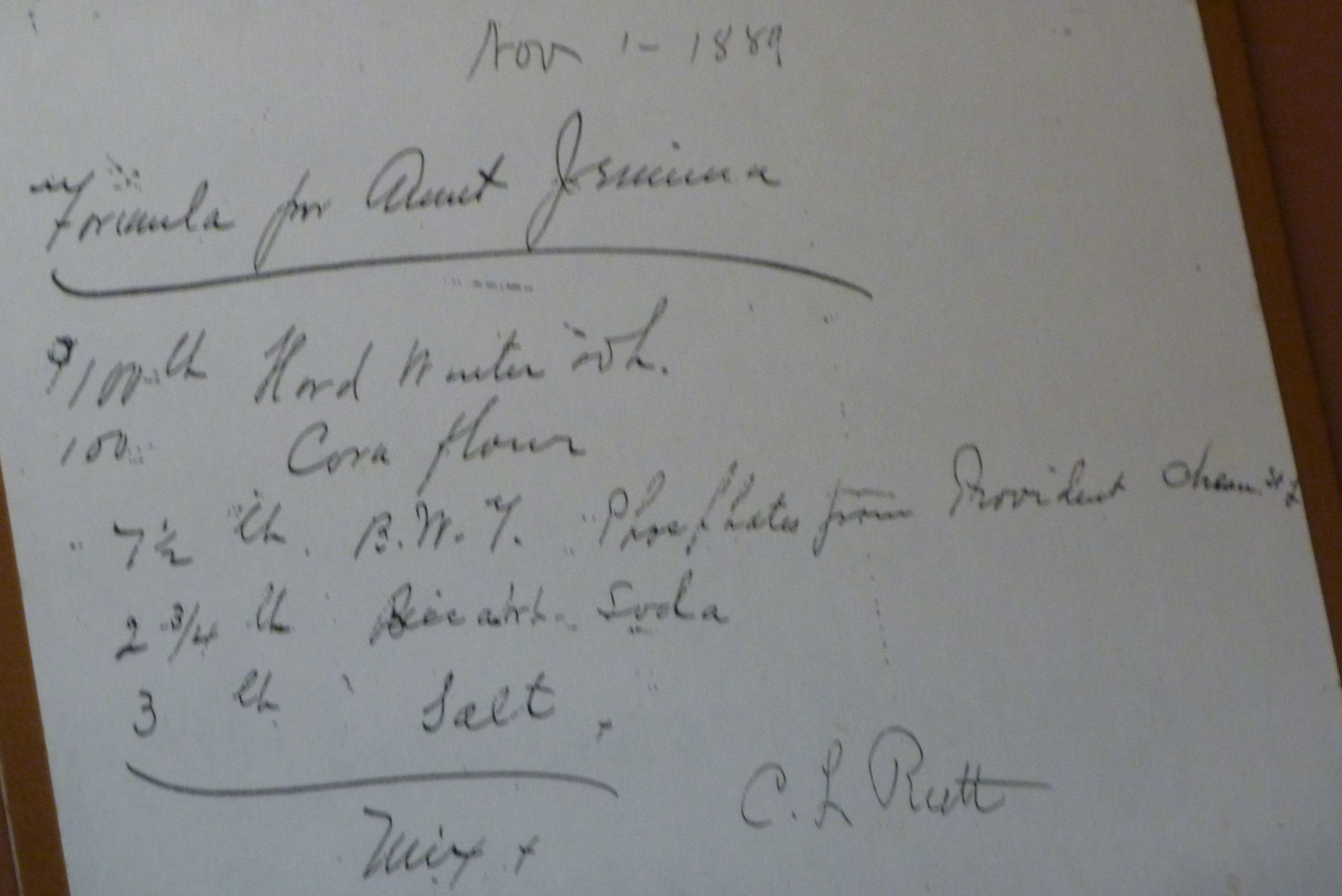
Rutt's recipe from November 1, 1889, on display at Patee House museum in St. Joseph, Missouri

In 1888, St. Joseph Gazette editor Chris L. Rutt and his friend Charles G. Underwood bought a small flour mill at 214 North Second Street in St. Joseph, Missouri. Rutt and Underwood's "Pearl Milling Company" produced a range of milled products (such as wheat flour and cornmeal) using a pearl milling process. Facing a glutted flour market, after a year of experimentation they began selling their excess flour in paper bags with the generic label "Self-Rising Pancake Flour" (later dubbed "the first ready-mix").

The original 1889 Formula was:

- 100 lb [45 kg] Hard Winter Wheat
- 100 lb [45 kg] Corn Flour
- 7 1/2 lb [3.4 kg] B.W.T. Phosphates from Provident Chem[ical] St L[ouis]
- 2 3/4 lb [1.2 kg] Bicarb[onate] Soda
- 3 lb [1.4 kg] Salt.

=== Branding and trademark ===
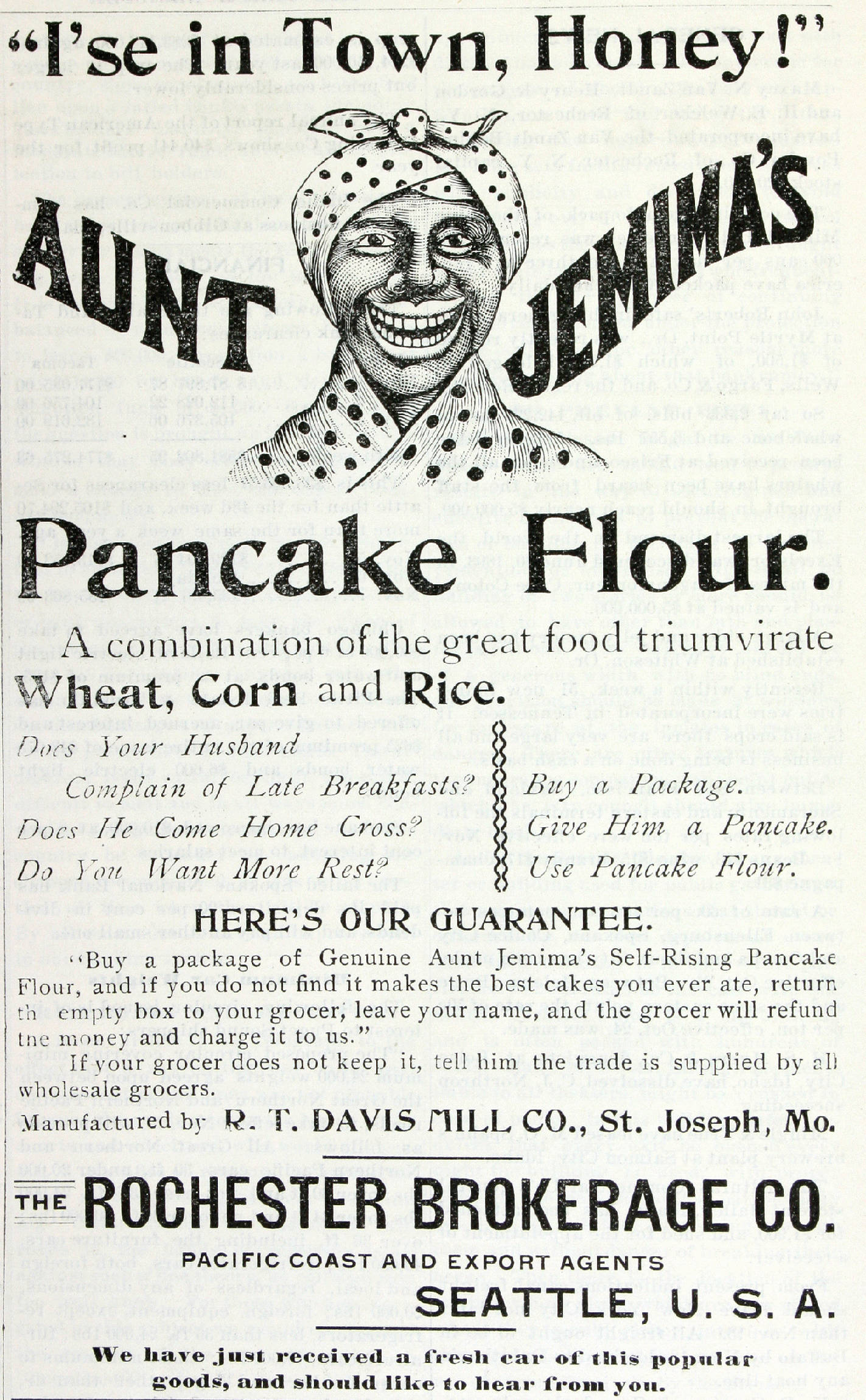
Aunt Jemima's pancake flour ad in 1894

To distinguish their pancake mix, in late 1889 Rutt appropriated the Aunt Jemima name and image from lithographed posters seen at a vaudeville house in St. Joseph, Missouri. However, Rutt and Underwood could not raise enough capital and quickly ran out of money. In 1890, they sold their Aunt Jemima Manufacturing Company to the Randolph Truett Davis Milling Company (also in St. Joseph, Missouri), then the largest flouring mill on the Missouri River, having an established reputation with wholesale and retail grocers throughout the Missouri River Valley.

R. T. Davis improved the flavor and texture of the product by adding rice flour and corn sugar, and simplified the ready-mix by adding powdered milk. Only water was then needed to prepare the batter. The brand became successful enough that the Davis Milling Company was renamed Aunt Jemima Mills in February 1914.

In 1915, the well-known Aunt Jemima brand was the basis for a trademark law ruling that set a new precedent. Previously, United States trademark law had protected against infringement by other sellers of the same product, but under the "Aunt Jemima Doctrine", the seller of pancake mix was also protected against infringement by an unrelated seller of a different but related product—pancake syrup. Aunt Jemima became one of the longest continually running logos and trademarks in the history of American advertising.

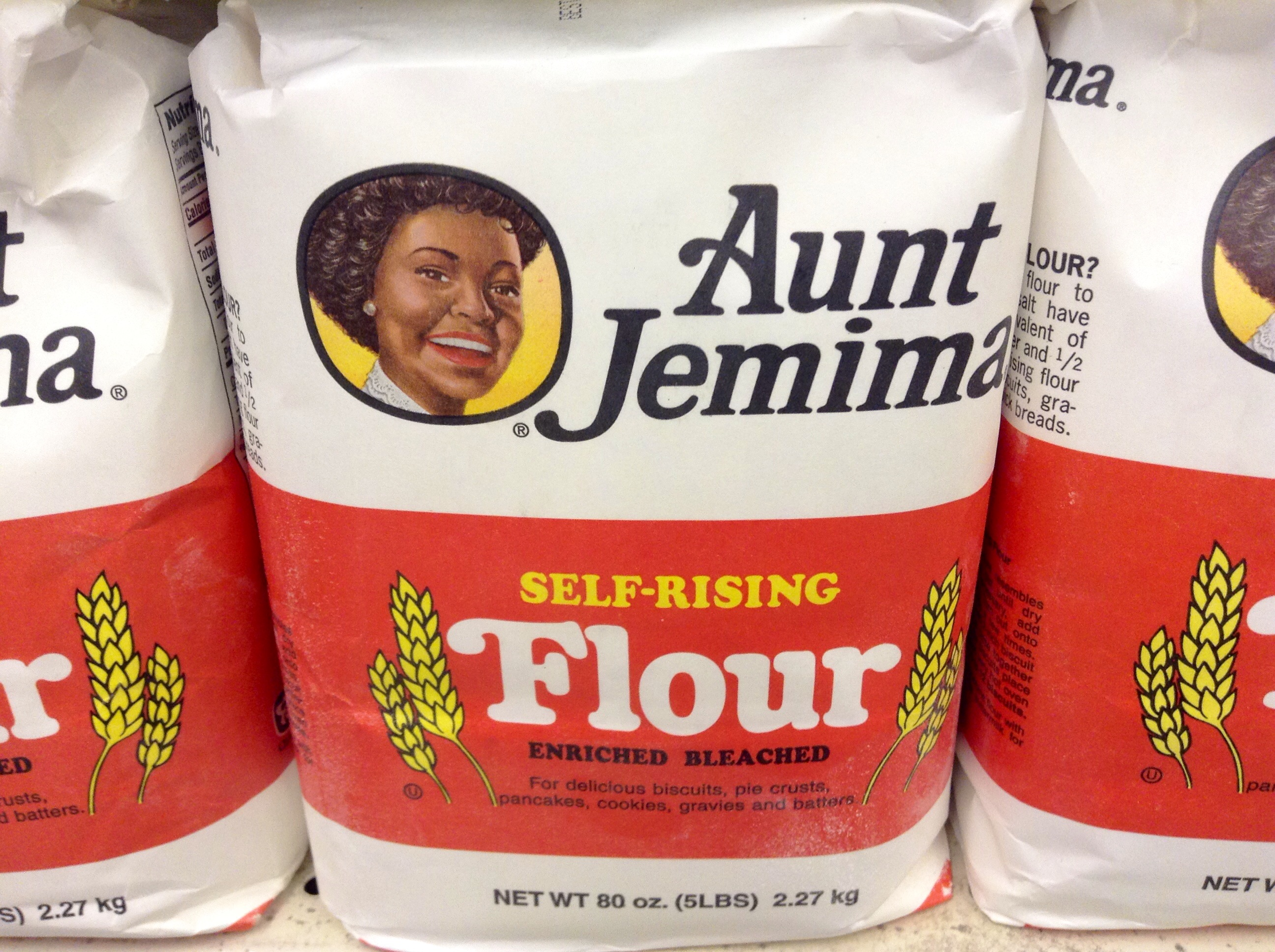
Aunt Jemima Flour with the old logo

The Quaker Oats Company purchased the Aunt Jemima Mills Company in 1926, and formally registered the Aunt Jemima trademark in April 1937.

Quaker Oats introduced Aunt Jemima syrup in 1966. This was followed by Aunt Jemima Butter Lite syrup in 1985 and Butter Rich syrup in 1991. Quaker Oats was purchased by PepsiCo in 2001.

Aunt Jemima branded frozen foods were licensed out to Aurora Foods in 1996, which was absorbed into Pinnacle Foods in 2004. This entire frozen food product lineup was permanently discontinued by Pinnacle Foods in 2017 following a product recall.

=== Rebranding of 2020–2021 ===
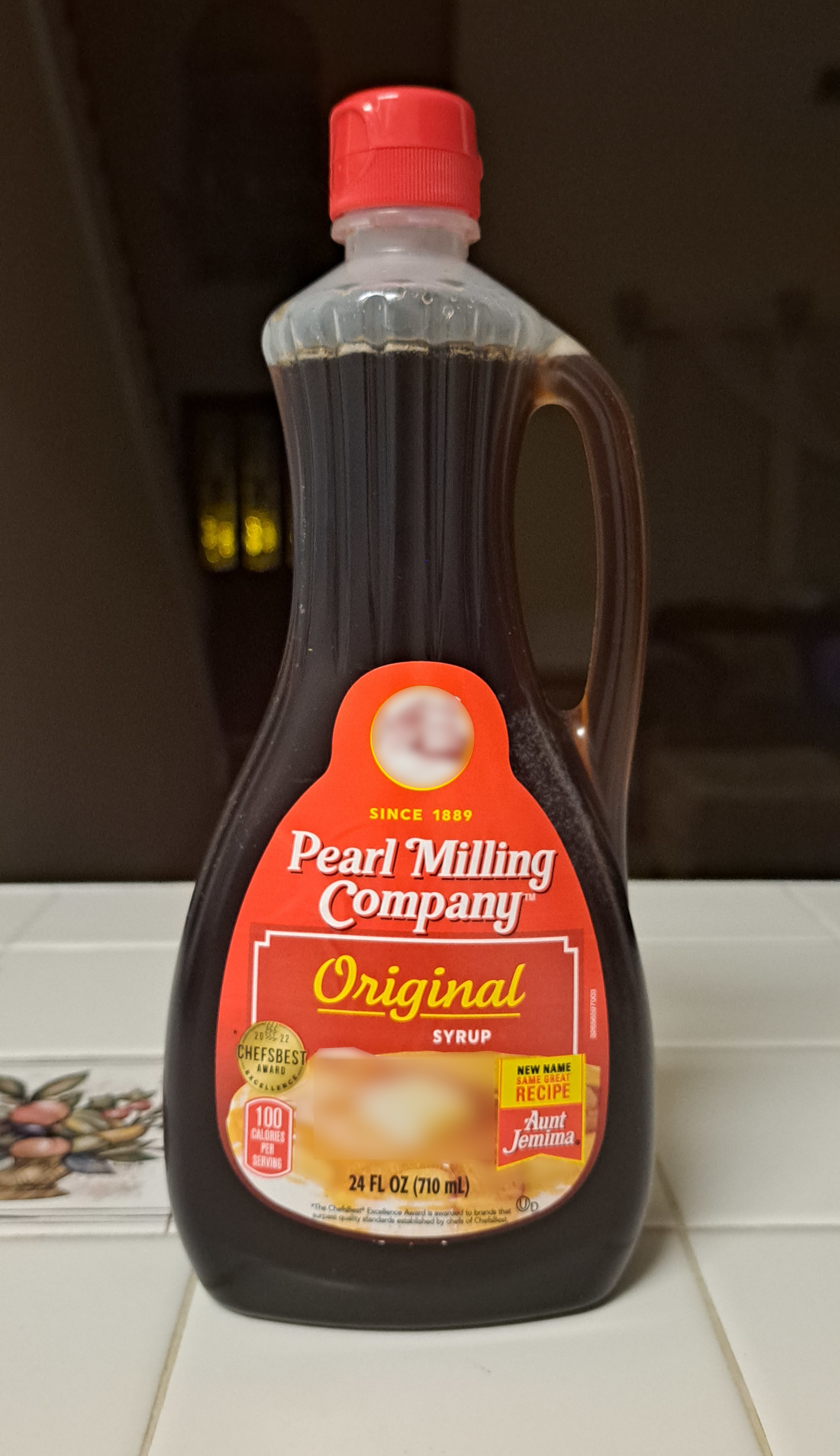
Pearl Milling syrup bottle

On June 17, 2020, Quaker Oats announced that the Aunt Jemima brand would be discontinued and replaced with a new name and image "to make progress toward racial equality". The image was removed from packaging in late 2020, while the name change was said to be planned for a later date.

On February 9, 2021, PepsiCo announced that the replacement brand name would be Pearl Milling Company. PepsiCo had purchased that brand name for that purpose on February 1, 2021. The new branding was launched that June, one year after the company announced they would drop Aunt Jemima branding.

PepsiCo referenced the Aunt Jemima brand by logotype on the front of the packaging for at least six months after the rebrand. Following that period, PepsiCo said it would not be able to completely permanently abandon the Aunt Jemima brand due to trademark law; if it does, a third party could obtain and use the brand.
