= Anna Short Harrington =

American model (1897–1955)

Anna Short Harrington (1897 – 1955) was an American model. She was one of several African-American models hired to promote a corporate trademark as "Aunt Jemima".

== Biography ==
Anna Short was born in 1897 in the Wallace area of Marlboro County, South Carolina.

The Short family lived on the Pegues Place plantation as sharecroppers. She grew up in Bennettsville, South Carolina, where she had three daughters and two sons.

Her husband, Weldon Harrington, left the family after 10 years of marriage. In 1927, she moved north to work as a maid for a family in Nedrow, New York.

A year later, she was reunited with her five children in Syracuse, New York.

Harrington cooked for various fraternity houses at Syracuse University. In 1935, Quaker Oats discovered her cooking pancakes at the New York State Fair in the Syracuse area.

A November 1935 ad in Woman's Home Companion emphasized her Southern accent and dialect, saying "Let ol' Auntie sing in yo' kitchen." Part of Harrington's marketability would have been her southern accent as a native of South Carolina.

Her last recorded appearance was the 1954 Post-Standard Home Show. She died in Syracuse in 1955 at the age of 58, and was buried at Oakwood Cemetery.

She had made enough money to purchase a 22-room house with a backyard bungalow on Monroe Street, in a segregated area known as the 15th Ward, at that time considered among the worst slums in the world. The multi-room house had been cut up into single room dwelling units, where she rented many of the rooms to boarders. The house was demolished for urban renewal and construction of Interstate 81 in the 1960s.

== Lawsuit ==
On August 5, 2014, descendants of Anna Short Harrington filed a lawsuit seeking a multi-billion dollar settlement in the U.S. District Court for the Northern District of Illinois against defendants Quaker Oats and PepsiCo. The suit, which also named as defendants Pinnacle Foods and its former suitor Hillshire Brands, accused the companies of failing to pay Harrington and her heirs an "equitable fair share of royalties" from the pancake mix and syrup brand that uses her likeness and recipes. The lawsuit was dismissed with prejudice and without leave to amend on February 18, 2015.
