= Aunt Jemima =

Former brand of breakfast foods

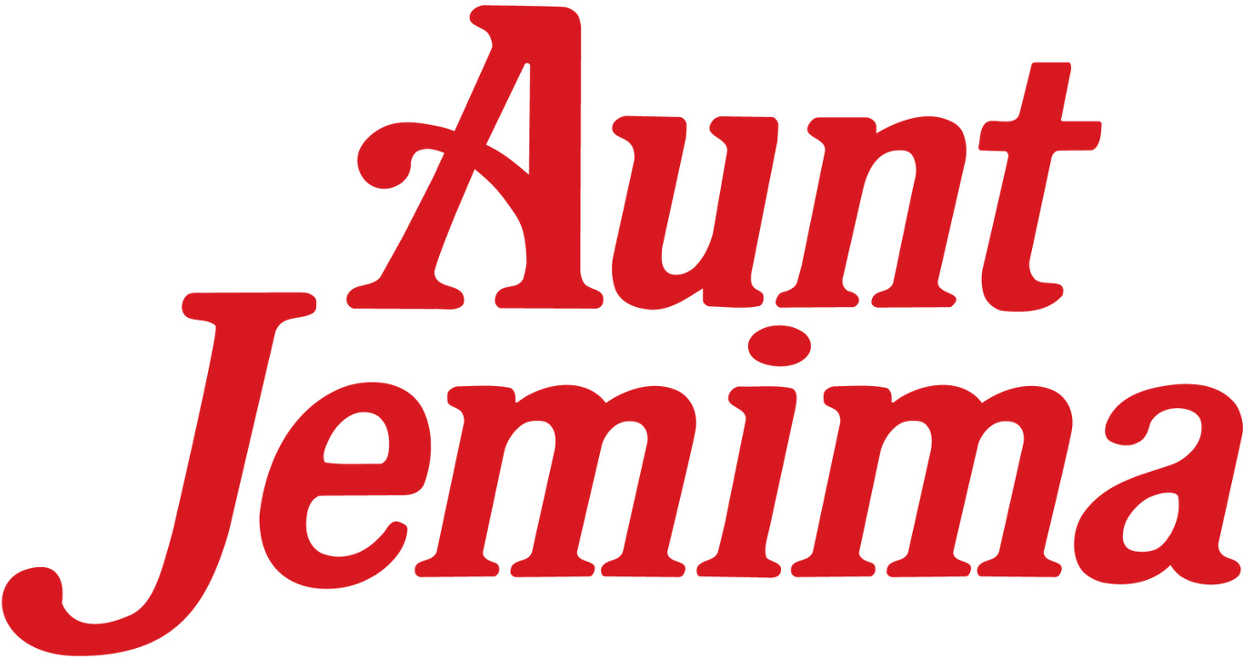

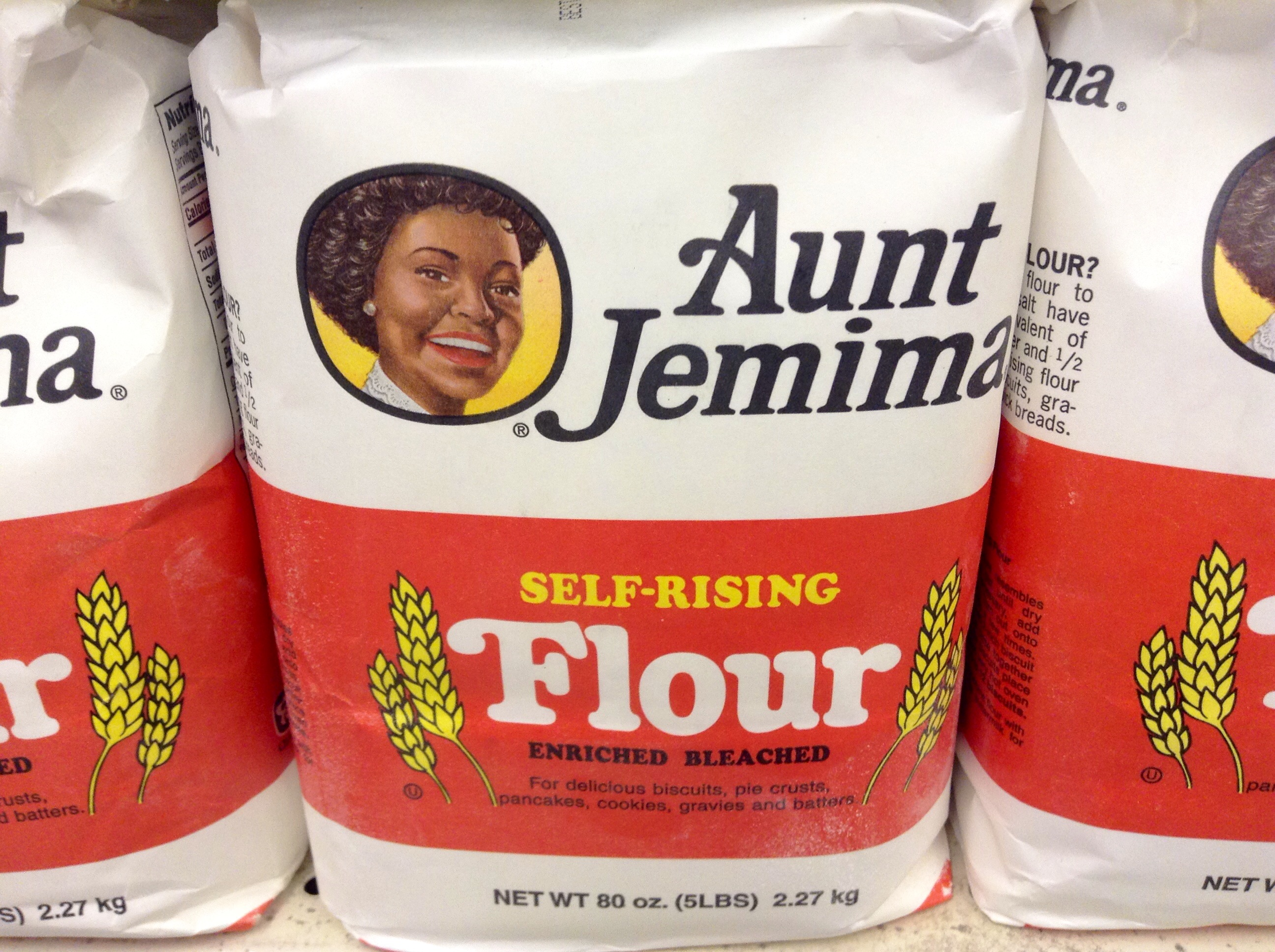
- Aunt Jemima flour pack
- Product type: Pancake mix Table syrup
- Country: United States
- Introduced: 1888
- Discontinued: 2021; 5 years ago
- Previous owners: Pearl Milling Company (1888–1926); Quaker Oats Company (1926–2001); PepsiCo (2001–2021)

Aunt Jemima is a discontinued American breakfast brand for pancake mix, table syrup, and other breakfast food products. The brand was retired in 2021 and is now sold under the name Pearl Milling Company. The original version of the pancake mix was developed in 1888–1889 by the Pearl Milling Company and was advertised as the first "ready-mix" cooking product.

Aunt Jemima was modeled after, and has been a famous example of, the "Mammy" archetype in the Southern United States. Due to the "Mammy" stereotype's historical ties to the Jim Crow era, Quaker Oats announced in June 2020 that the Aunt Jemima brand would be discontinued "to make progress toward racial equality", leading to the Aunt Jemima image being removed by the fourth quarter of 2020.

In June 2021, amidst heightened racial unrest in the United States, the Aunt Jemima brand name was discontinued by its current owner, PepsiCo, with all products rebranded to Pearl Milling Company, the name of the company that produced the original pancake mix product. The Aunt Jemima name remains in use in the brand's tagline: "Same great taste as Aunt Jemima."

Nancy Green portrayed the Aunt Jemima character at the 1893 World's Columbian Exposition in Chicago and was one of the first black corporate models in the United States. Subsequent advertising agencies hired dozens of actresses to perform the role as the first organized sales promotion campaign.

== History ==
In 1888, St. Joseph Gazette editor Chris L. Rutt and his friend Charles G. Underwood bought a small flour mill at 214 North 2nd St. in St. Joseph, Missouri. Rutt and Underwood's "Pearl Milling Company" produced a range of milled products (such as wheat flour and cornmeal) using a pearl-milling process. Facing a glutted flour market, after a year of experimentation, they began selling their excess flour in paper bags with the generic label "Self-Rising Pancake Flour" (later dubbed "the first ready-mix").

=== Branding and trademark ===
To distinguish their pancake mix, in late 1889, Rutt appropriated the Aunt Jemima name and image from lithographed posters seen at a vaudeville house in St. Joseph, Missouri. At the 1893 World's Columbian Exposition in Chicago, the company set up a pancake-cooking display next to the "world's largest flour barrel" (twenty-four feet high). Nancy Green, a former slave from Montgomery County, Kentucky, portrayed the character and cooked pancakes, sang songs, and promoted the product.

In 1915, the well known Aunt Jemima brand was the basis for a trademark law ruling that set a new precedent. Previously, United States trademark law had protected against infringement by other sellers of the same product, but, under the "Aunt Jemima Doctrine", the seller of pancake mix was also protected against infringement by an unrelated seller of a different but related product: pancake syrup. Aunt Jemima became one of the longest continually running logos and trademarks in the history of American advertising.

=== Logo ===
The earliest advertising was based upon a vaudeville parody, and it remained a caricature for many years.

Quaker Oats commissioned Haddon Sundblom, a nationally known commercial artist, to paint a portrait of an obese actress named Anna Robinson, and the Aunt Jemima package was redesigned around the new likeness.

James J. Jaffee, a freelance artist from the Bronx, New York, also designed one of the images of Aunt Jemima used by Quaker Oats to market the product into the mid-20th century.

Just as the formula for the mix changed several times over the years, so did the Aunt Jemima image. In 1968, the face of Aunt Jemima became a composited creation. She was slimmed down from her previous appearance, depicting a more "svelte" look, wearing a white collar and a geometric print "headband" still resembling her previous kerchief.

In 1989, marking the 100th anniversary of the brand, her image was again updated, with all head-covering removed, revealing wavy, gray-streaked hair, gold-trimmed pearl earrings, and replacing her plain white collar with lace. At the time, the revised image was described as a move towards a more "sophisticated" depiction, with Quaker marketing the change as giving her "a more contemporary look", which remained on the products until early 2021.

=== Rebranding of 2020–2021 ===
On June 17, 2020, Quaker Oats announced that the Aunt Jemima brand would be discontinued and replaced with a new name and image "to make progress toward racial equality". The image was removed from packaging in fall 2020, while the name change was said to be planned for a later date.

Within one day of the June 2020 announcement, other similarly motivated rebrandings and reviews of brand marketing were also announced, including for Uncle Ben's rice (which was renamed Ben's Original), the Mrs. Butterworth's pancake syrup brand and bottle shape, and the "Rastus" black-chef logo used by Cream of Wheat.

Descendants of Aunt Jemima models Lillian Richard and Anna Short Harrington objected to the change. Vera Harris, a family historian for Richard's family, said "I wish we would take a breath and not just get rid of everything. Because good or bad, it is our history." Harris further stated that "Erasing my Aunt Lillian Richard would erase a part of history." Harrington's great-grandson Larnell Evans said "This is an injustice for me and my family. This is part of my history." Evans had previously lost a lawsuit against Quaker Oats (and others) for billions of dollars in 2015.

On February 9, 2021, PepsiCo announced that the replacement brand name would be Pearl Milling Company. PepsiCo purchased that brand name for that purpose on February 1, 2021. The new branding was launched that June, one year after the company announced that they would drop Aunt Jemima branding. PepsiCo referenced the Aunt Jemima brand by logotype on the front of the packaging for at least six months after the rebrand. Following that period, PepsiCo said that it wouldn't be able to completely and permanently abandon the Aunt Jemima brand due to trademark law; if it did, a third party could obtain and use the brand.

== Character of Aunt Jemima ==
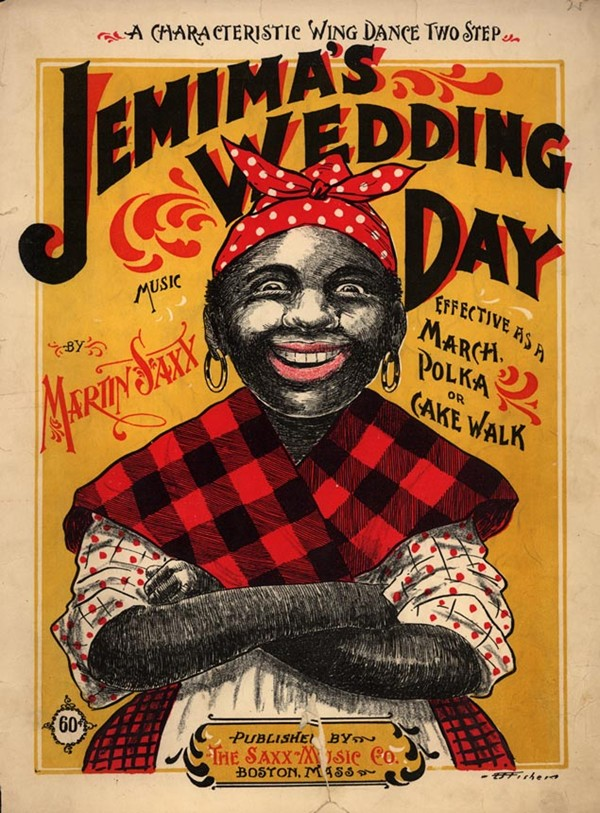
"Jemima" character on 1899 cakewalk sheet music cover

Aunt Jemima is based on the common enslaved "Mammy" archetype, a plump black woman wearing a headscarf who is a devoted and submissive servant. Her skin is dark and dewy, with a pearly-white smile. Although depictions vary over time, they are similar to the common attire and physical features of "mammy" characters throughout American history.

The terms "aunt" and "uncle" in this context were a Southern form of address used with older enslaved persons. They were denied use of English honorifics, such as "mistress" and "mister", respectively.

A British image in the Library of Congress, which may have been created as early as 1847, shows a smiling black woman named "Miss Jim-Ima Crow", with a framed image of "James Crow" on the wall behind her. A character named "Aunt Jemima" appeared on the stage in Washington, D.C., as early as 1864. Rutt's inspiration for Aunt Jemima was Billy Kersands's American-style minstrelsy/vaudeville song "Old Aunt Jemima", written in 1875. Rutt reportedly saw a minstrel show featuring the "Old Aunt Jemima" song in the fall of 1889, presented by blackface performers identified by Arthur F. Marquette as "Baker & Farrell". Marquette recounts that the actor playing Aunt Jemima wore an apron and kerchief.

However, Doris Witt at University of Iowa was unable to confirm Marquette's account. Witt suggests that Rutt might have witnessed a performance by the vaudeville performer Pete F. Baker, who played characters described in newspapers of that era as "Ludwig" and "Aunt Jemima". His portrayal of the Aunt Jemima character may have been a white male in blackface, pretending to be a German immigrant imitating a black minstrel parodying an imaginary black female enslaved cook.

=== Advertising ===
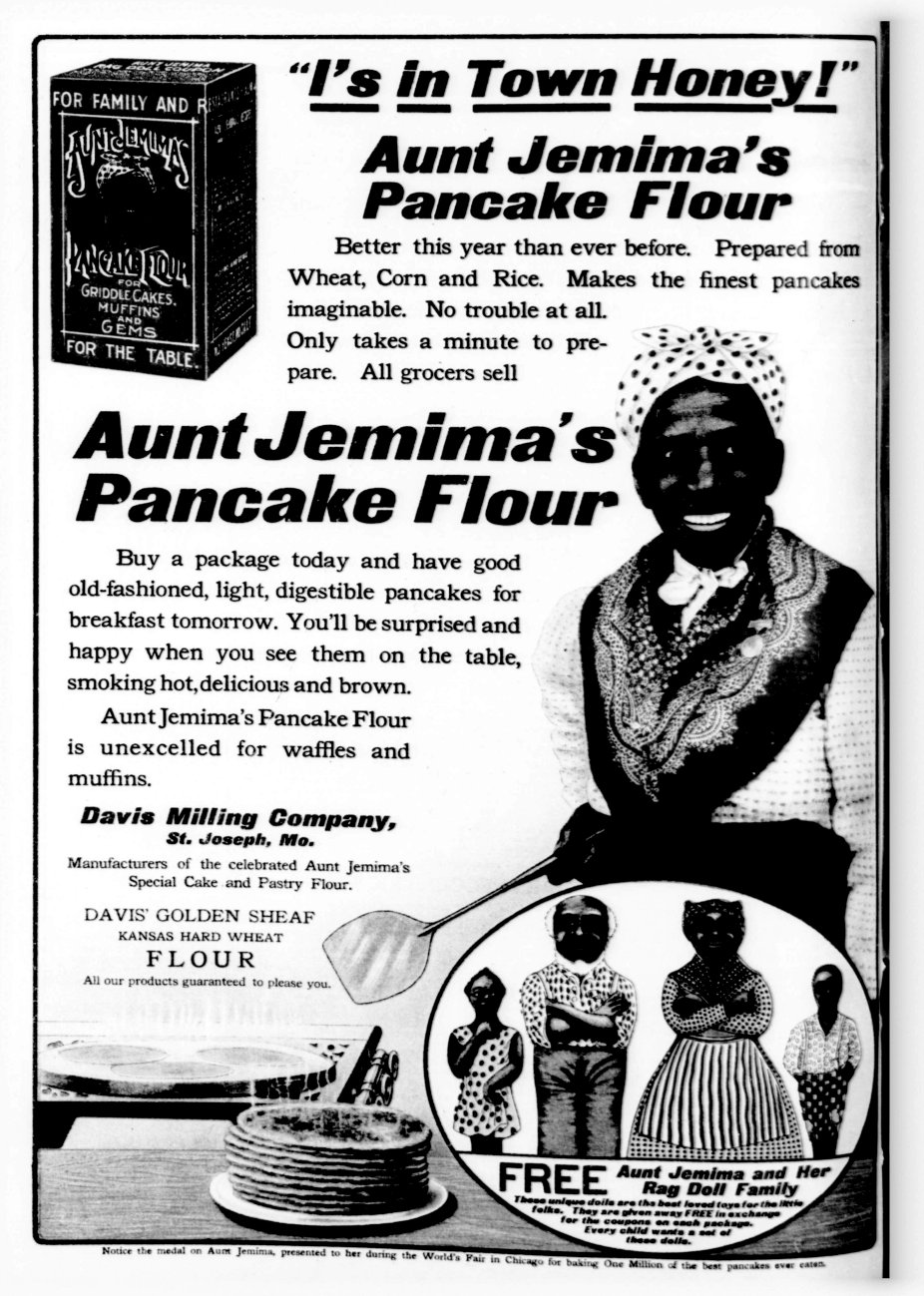

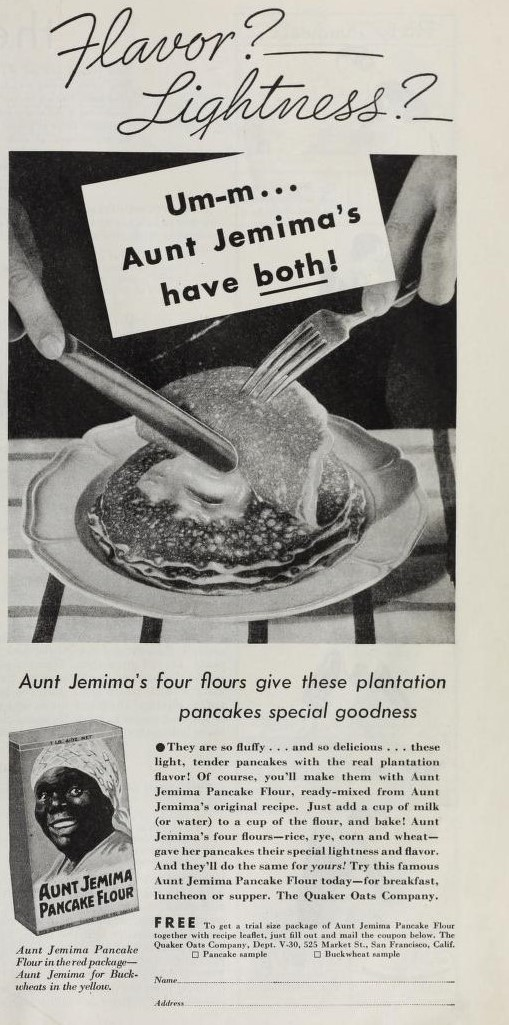
1935 Quaker Oats magazine advertisement for Aunt Jemima pancake mix, featuring Anna Robinson as Aunt Jemima

1909 ad showing unidentified actor as Aunt Jemima, and rag doll family promotion

Marketing materials for the line of products centered around the "Mammy" archetype, including the slogan first used at the 1893 World's Columbian Exposition in Chicago, Illinois: "I's in Town, Honey".

At that World's Fair, and for decades afterward, marketers created and circulated fictional stories about Aunt Jemima. She was presented as a "loyal cook" for a fictional Colonel Higbee's Louisiana plantation on the Mississippi River. Jemima was said to use a secret recipe "from the South before the Civil War", with their "matchless plantation flavor", to make the best pancakes in Dixie. Another story described her as diverting Union soldiers during the Civil War with her pancakes long enough for Colonel Higbee to escape. She was said to have revived a group of shipwrecked survivors with her flapjacks.

Beginning in 1894, the company added an Aunt Jemima paper doll family that could be cut out from the pancake box. Aunt Jemima is joined by her husband, Uncle Rastus (later renamed Uncle Mose to avoid confusion with the Cream of Wheat character, while Uncle Mose was first introduced as the plantation butler). Their children, described as "comical pickaninnies", were named Abraham Lincoln, Dilsie, Zeb, and Dinah. The paper-doll family was posed dancing barefoot and dressed in tattered clothing, and the box was labeled "Before the Receipt was sold". (Receipt is an archaic rural form of recipe.) Buying another box with elegant clothing cut-outs to fit over the dolls, the customer could transform them "After the Receipt was sold". This placed them in the Horatio Alger rags-to-riches American cultural mythos.

Rag-doll versions were offered as a premium in 1909: "Aunt Jemima Pancake Flour / Pica ninny Doll / The Davis Milling Company". Early versions were portrayed as poor people with patches on their trousers, large mouths, and missing teeth. The children's names were changed to Diana and Wade. Over time, there were improvements in appearance. Oil-cloth versions were available circa the 1950s, with cartoonish features, round eyes, and watermelon mouths.

A typical magazine ad from the turn of the century created by advertising executive James Webb Young and the illustrator N.C. Wyeth shows a heavyset black cook talking happily while a white man takes notes. The ad copy says, "After the Civil War, after her master's death, Aunt Jemima was finally persuaded to sell her famous pancake recipe to the representative of a northern milling company."

However, the Davis Milling Company was not located in a Northern state: Missouri in the American Civil War was a hotly contested border state. In reality, Aunt Jemima never existed, created by marketers to better sell products.

=== Controversy ===
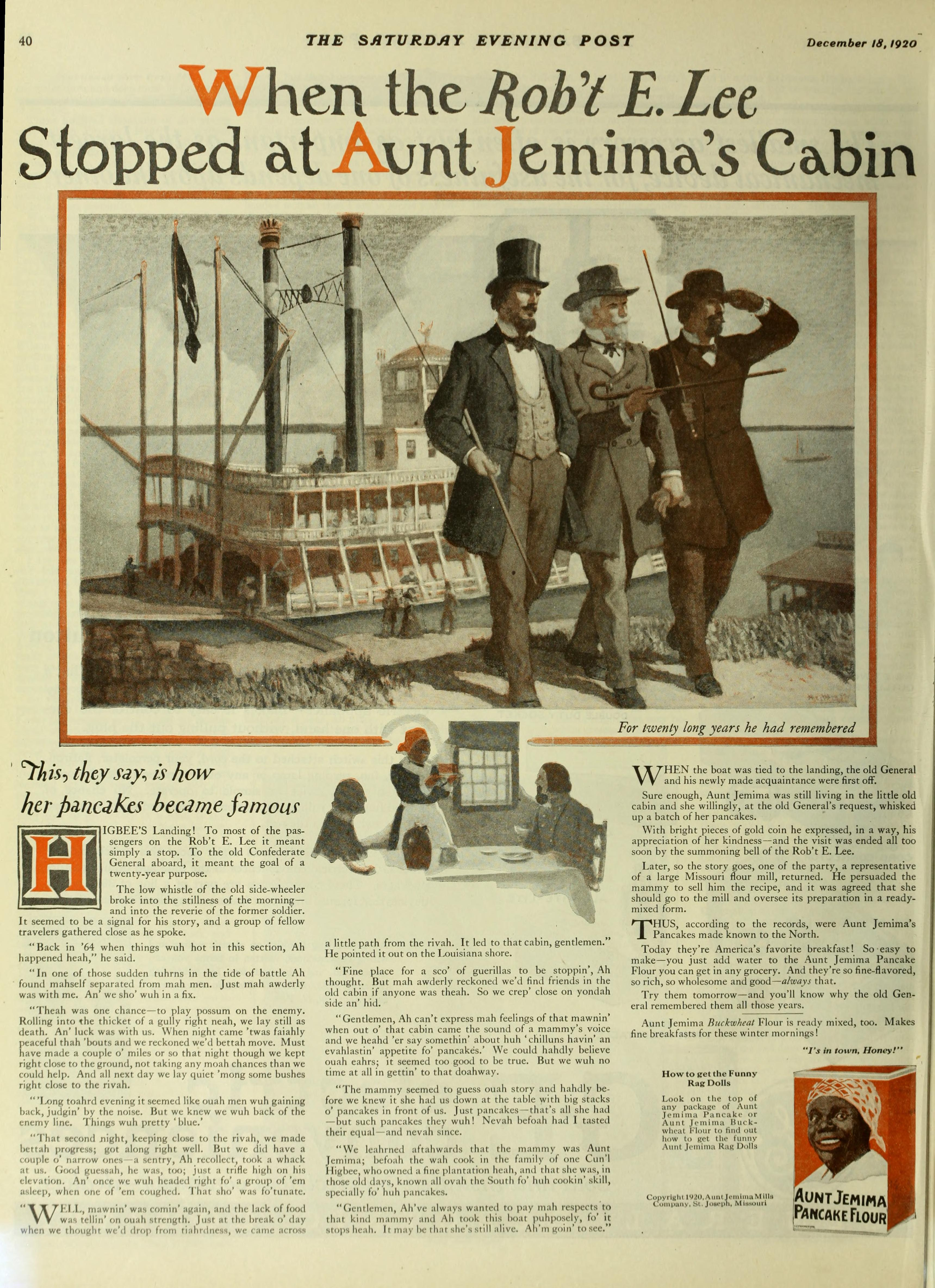
1920 Saturday Evening Post ad with N.C. Wyeth illustration

Although the Aunt Jemima character was not created until nearly 25 years after the American Civil War, the clothing, dancing, enslaved dialect, and singing old plantation songs as she worked, all harkened back to a glorified view of antebellum Southern plantation life as a "happy slave" narrative. The marketing legend surrounding Aunt Jemima's successful commercialization of her "secret recipe" contributed to the post-Civil War nostalgia and romanticism of Southern life in service of America's developing consumer culture—especially in the context of selling kitchen items.

African-American women formed the Women's Columbian Association and the Women's Columbian Auxiliary Association to address the exclusion of African Americans from the 1893 World's Fair exhibitions, asking that the fair reflect the success of post-Emancipation African Americans. Instead, the Fair included a miniature West African village whose natives were portrayed as primitive savages. Ida B. Wells was incensed by the exclusion of African Americans from mainstream fair activities; the so-called "Negro Day" was a picnic held off-site from the fairgrounds.

Black scholars Hallie Quinn Brown, Anna Julia Cooper, and Fannie Barrier Williams used the World's Fair as an opportunity to address how African-American women were being exploited by white men. In her book A Voice from the South (1892), Cooper had noted the fascination with "Southern influence, Southern ideas, and Southern ideals" had "dictated to and domineered over the brain and sinew of this nation".

These educated progressive women saw "a mammy for the national household" represented at the World's Fair by Aunt Jemima, according to Professor Kimberly Wallace-Sanders of Emory University. The women argued that this directly relates to the belief that slavery cultivated innate qualities in African Americans. According to them, the notion that African Americans were natural servants reinforced a racist ideology renouncing the reality of African American intellect. These women also contended that Aunt Jemima embodied a post-Reconstruction fantasy of idealized domesticity, inspired by "happy slave" hospitality, and revealed a deep need to redeem the antebellum South. There were others that capitalized on this theme, such as Uncle Ben's Rice and Cream of Wheat's Rastus.

=== Slang ===
The term "Aunt Jemima" is sometimes used colloquially as a female version of the derogatory epithet "Uncle Tom" or "Rastus". In this context, the slang term "Aunt Jemima" falls within the "mammy archetype" and refers to a friendly black woman who is perceived as obsequiously servile or acting in, or protective of, the interests of whites.

John Sylvester of WTDY-AM drew criticism after calling Condoleezza Rice an "Aunt Jemima" and Colin Powell an "Uncle Tom", referring to remarks by singer and civil rights activist Harry Belafonte about their alleged subservience in the George W. Bush administration. He apologized by giving away Aunt Jemima's pancake mix and syrup.

Barry Presgraves, then 77-year-old Mayor of Luray, Virginia, was censured 5-to-1 by the town council because he referred to Kamala Harris as "Aunt Jemima" after she was selected by Joe Biden to be the Democratic Party vice presidential candidate.

== Performers of Aunt Jemima ==
The African American Registry of the United States suggests Nancy Green and others who played the caricature of Aunt Jemima should be celebrated despite what has been widely condemned as a stereotypical and racist brand image. The registry wrote, "We celebrate the birth of Nancy Green in 1834. She was a Black storyteller and one of the first Black corporate models in the United States."

Following Green's work as Aunt Jemima, very few were well known. Advertising agencies (such as J. Walter Thompson, Lord and Thomas, and others) hired dozens of actors to portray the role, often assigned regionally, as the first organized sales promotion campaign.

Quaker Oats ended local appearances for Aunt Jemima in 1965.

=== Nancy Green ===
Nancy Green was the first spokesperson hired by the R. T. Davis Milling Company for the Aunt Jemima pancake mix. Green was born into slavery in Montgomery County, Kentucky. Dressed as Aunt Jemima, Green appeared at the 1893 World's Columbian Exposition in Chicago, beside the "world's largest flour barrel" (24 feet high), where she operated a pancake-cooking display, sang songs, and told romanticized stories about the Old South (a happy place for blacks and whites alike). She appeared at fairs, festivals, flea markets, food shows, and local grocery stores, her arrival heralded by large billboards featuring the caption, "I'se in town, honey."

Green refused to cross the Atlantic Ocean for the 1900 Paris exhibition. She was replaced by Agnes Moody. Green died in 1923 and was buried in an unmarked pauper's grave in Chicago's Oak Woods Cemetery. A headstone was placed on September 5, 2020.

=== Agnes Moody ===
60-year-old Agnes Moody first performed as Aunt Jemima at the 1900 Paris exhibition, and was erroneously reported as the original Aunt Jemima. She had become well known in the Chicago area for her cornmeal bread and cakes. She died April 9, 1903.

=== Lillian Richard ===
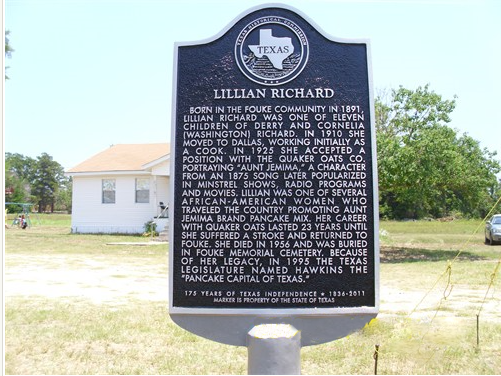
Historical marker dedicated to Lillian Richard, Aunt Jemima portrayer

Lillian Richard was hired to portray Aunt Jemima in 1925, and she remained in the role for 23 years. Richard was born in 1891, and grew up in the tiny community of Fouke seven miles west of Hawkins in Wood County, Texas. In 1910, she moved to Dallas, working initially as a cook. Her job "pitching pancakes" was based in Paris, Texas. After she suffered a stroke circa 1947–1948, she returned to Fouke, where she lived until her death in 1956. Richard was honored with a Texas Historical Marker in her hometown, dedicated in her name on June 30, 2012.

Hawkins, Texas, east of Mineola, is known as the "Pancake Capital of Texas" because of longtime resident Lillian Richard. The local chamber of commerce decided to use Hawkins's connection to Aunt Jemima to boost tourism. In 1995, state senator David Cain introduced Senate Resolution No. 73 designating Hawkins as the "Pancake Capital of Texas", which was passed into law; the measure was spearheaded by Lillian's niece, Jewell Richard-McCalla.

=== Artie Belle McGinty ===
In 1927, Artie Belle McGinty debuted as the original radio advertisement voice for Aunt Jemima.

=== Anna Robinson ===
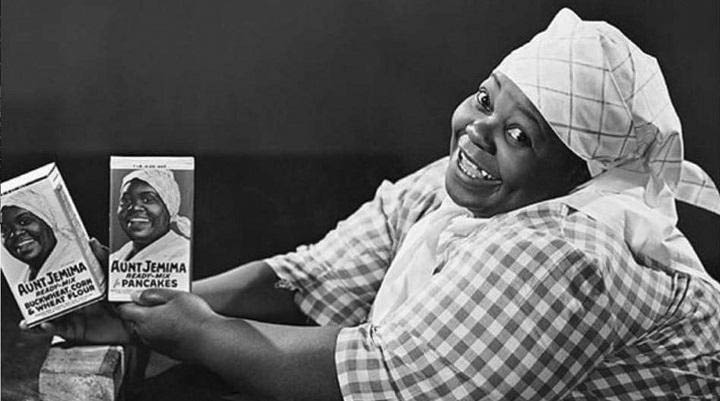
Anna Robinson as Aunt Jemima in an advertisement

Anna Robinson was hired to play Aunt Jemima at the 1933 Century of Progress Chicago World's Fair. Robinson answered an open audition, and her appearance was more like the "mammy" stereotype than the slender Lillian Richard. Born circa 1899, she was also from Kentucky and widowed (like Green), but in her thirties, with eight years of education. She was sent to New York City by Lord and Thomas to have her picture taken. A 1967 company history commemorated this journey as "the day they loaded 350 pounds of Anna Robinson on the Twentieth Century Limited."

She appeared at prestigious establishments frequented by the rich and famous, such as El Morocco, the Stork Club, "21", and the Waldorf-Astoria. Photos show Robinson making pancakes for celebrities and stars of Broadway, radio, and motion pictures. They were used in advertising "ranked among the highest read of their time". The Aunt Jemima packaging was redesigned in her likeness.

Robinson reportedly worked for the company until her death in 1951; however, the work, which was sporadic and for mere weeks in a year, was not enough to escape the hard life into which she had been born. Her $1,200 total payment in 1939 (equivalent to $27,775 in 2025) was almost the entirety of the household's annual income and stood in stark contrast to the official Aunt Jemima history timeline, which stated that Robinson was "able to make enough money to provide for her children and buy a 22-room house where she rents rooms to boarders". The same claim was made for Anna Short Harrington, yet, according to the 1940 census, she rented an apartment in a four-flat in Washington Park with her daughter, son-in-law, and two grandchildren.

=== Rosa Washington Riles ===
Rosa Washington Riles became the third face on Aunt Jemima packaging in the 1930s, and continued until 1948. Rosa Washington was born in 1901 near Red Oak in Brown County, Ohio, one of several children of Robert and Julie (Holliday) Washington and a granddaughter of George and Phoeba Washington. She was employed as a cook in the home of a Quaker Oats executive and began pancake demonstrations at her employer's request. She died in 1969, and is buried near her parents and grandparents in the historic Red Oak Presbyterian Church cemetery of Ripley, Ohio. An annual Aunt Jemima breakfast has been a long-time fundraiser for the cemetery, and the church maintains a collection of Aunt Jemima memorabilia.

=== Anna Short Harrington ===
Anna Short Harrington began her career as Aunt Jemima in 1935 and continued to play the role until 1954. She was born in 1897 in Marlboro County, South Carolina. The Short family lived on the Pegues Place plantation as sharecroppers. In 1927, she moved to Syracuse, New York. Quaker Oats discovered her cooking pancakes at the 1935 New York State Fair. Harrington died in Syracuse in 1955.

=== Edith Wilson ===
Edith Wilson was the face and voice of Aunt Jemima on radio, television, and in personal appearances, from 1948 to 1966. She was the first Aunt Jemima to appear in television commercials. Born in 1896 in Louisville, Kentucky, Wilson was a classic blues singer and actress in Chicago, New York, and London. She appeared on radio in The Great Gildersleeve, on radio and television in Amos 'n' Andy, and on film in To Have and Have Not (1944). Wilson died in Chicago on March 31, 1981.

=== Ethel Ernestine Harper ===
Ethel Ernestine Harper portrayed Aunt Jemima during the 1950s. Harper was born on September 17, 1903, in Greensboro, Alabama. After graduating from college at the age of 17, she taught elementary school for 2 years and high school mathematics for 10 years. She then moved to New York City, where she performed in The Hot Mikado in 1939. She also appeared in Harlem Cavalcade in 1942 and toured Europe during and after World War II as one of the Ginger Snaps. Harper, who was the last individual model for the character's logo, died in Morristown, New Jersey on March 31, 1979.

=== Rosie Lee Moore Hall ===
Rosie Lee Moore Hall, the last "living" Aunt Jemima, was born in Robertson County, Texas on June 22, 1899. She was working in the Quaker Oats' advertising department in Oklahoma when she answered their search for a new Aunt Jemima. Hall portrayed Aunt Jemima from 1950 until her death (on her way to church) from a heart attack on February 12, 1967. She was buried in the family plot in the Colony Cemetery near Wheelock, Texas. On May 7, 1988, her grave was declared a historical landmark.

=== Aylene Lewis ===
Aylene Lewis portrayed Aunt Jemima at the Disneyland Aunt Jemima's Pancake House, a popular eating place at the park on New Orleans Street in Frontierland, from 1957 until her death in 1964. Lewis became well known posing for pictures with visitors and serving pancakes to dignitaries, such as Indian prime minister Jawaharlal Nehru. She also developed a close relationship with Walt Disney.

== In popular culture ==
Aunt Jemima has been featured in various formats and settings throughout popular culture. Aunt Jemima has been a present image identifiable by popular culture for well over a century, dating back to Nancy Green's appearance at the 1893 World Fair in Chicago, Illinois.

Aunt Jemima, a minstrel-type variety radio program, was broadcast January 17, 1929 – June 5, 1953, at times on CBS and at other times on the Blue Network. The program had several hiatuses during its time on the air.

In the 1960s, Betye Saar began collecting images of Aunt Jemima, Uncle Tom, Little Black Sambo, and other stereotyped African-American figures from folk culture and advertising of the Jim Crow era. She incorporated them into collages and assemblages, transforming them into statements of political and social protest. The Liberation of Aunt Jemima is one of her most notable works from this era. In this mixed-media assemblage, Saar utilized the stereotypical mammy figure of Aunt Jemima to subvert traditional notions of race and gender.

"Aunt Jemima's Kitchen"—named Aunt Jemima's Pancake House when it first started operating in 1955—was a restaurant opened in 1962 during the Civil Rights Movement as the official Aunt Jemima restaurant at Disneyland. In addition to the restaurant, a woman portraying Aunt Jemima was poised at the restaurant to take pictures with its patrons. Aunt Jemima's Kitchen also had additional locations across the United States. However, the Disneyland location closed in July 1970 after Quaker Oats withdrew its sponsorship following a dispute with The Walt Disney Company over control of the restaurant.

The Aunt Jemima character, portrayed at the time by Edith Wilson, received the Key to the City of Albion, Michigan, on January 25, 1964. Actresses portraying Aunt Jemima visited Albion, Battle Creek ("Cereal City"), and other Michigan cities many times over three decades. Grand Rapids had an Aunt Jemima's Kitchen, one of 21 locations, until it was changed to Colonial Kitchen in 1968.

Frank Zappa includes a song titled "Electric Aunt Jemima" on his 1969 album Uncle Meat. Electric Aunt Jemima was the nickname for Zappa's Standel guitar amplifier.

Faith Ringgold's first quilt story Who's Afraid of Aunt Jemima? (1983) depicts the story of Aunt Jemima as a matriarch restaurateur. Through mediums of text and imagery used to characterize Aunt Jemima in the public sphere, Ringgold represented the oppressed mammy caricature as an entrepreneur.

The animated sitcom Family Guy parodied the brand in its 1999 debut episode, "Death Has a Shadow." During a cutaway gag, a door-to-door solicitor dressed as the Aunt Jemima mascot knocks on a door to offer suburban residents fresh pancakes. Peter Griffin refers to the character as a "Jemima's Witness," a wordplay combining the brand name with Jehovah's Witnesses.

== See also ==
- List of syrups
- Banania
- Betty Crocker
- Darlie
- Rastus
- Sarotti
