= Sugar glass =

Brittle form of sugar that looks like glass

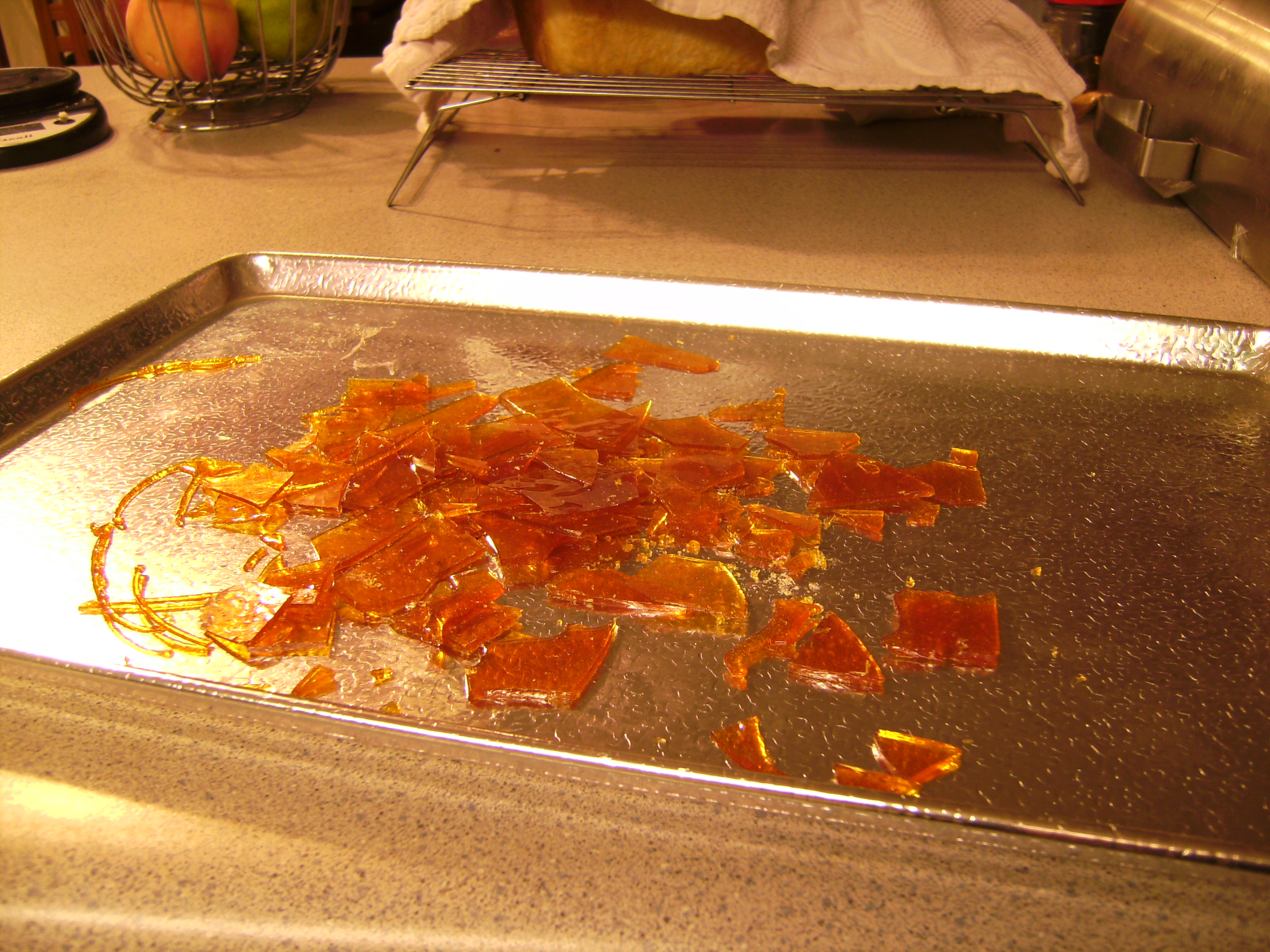
Caramelized sugar glass

Sugar glass (also called candy glass, edible glass, breakaway glass, or Hollywood glass) is a brittle transparent form of sugar that looks like glass. It can be formed into a sheet that looks like flat glass or an object, such as a bottle or drinking glass.

== Description ==
Sugar glass is made by dissolving sugar in water and heating it to at least the "hard crack" stage (approx. 150 °C or 300 °F) in the candy making process. Glucose or corn syrup is used to prevent the sugar from recrystallizing and becoming opaque, by disrupting the orderly arrangement of the molecules. Cream of tartar is also used for this purpose, converting the sugar into glucose and fructose.

Because sugar glass is hygroscopic, it must be used soon after preparation, or it will soften and lose its brittle quality.

Sugar glass has been used to simulate glass in movies, photographs, plays and professional wrestling.

== Other uses ==
Sugar glass is also used to make sugar sculptures or other forms of edible art.

Sugar glass dyed with blue food coloring was used to represent the methamphetamine in the AMC TV series Breaking Bad. Actor Aaron Paul would eat it on set.
