= Hawkins, Texas =

- City
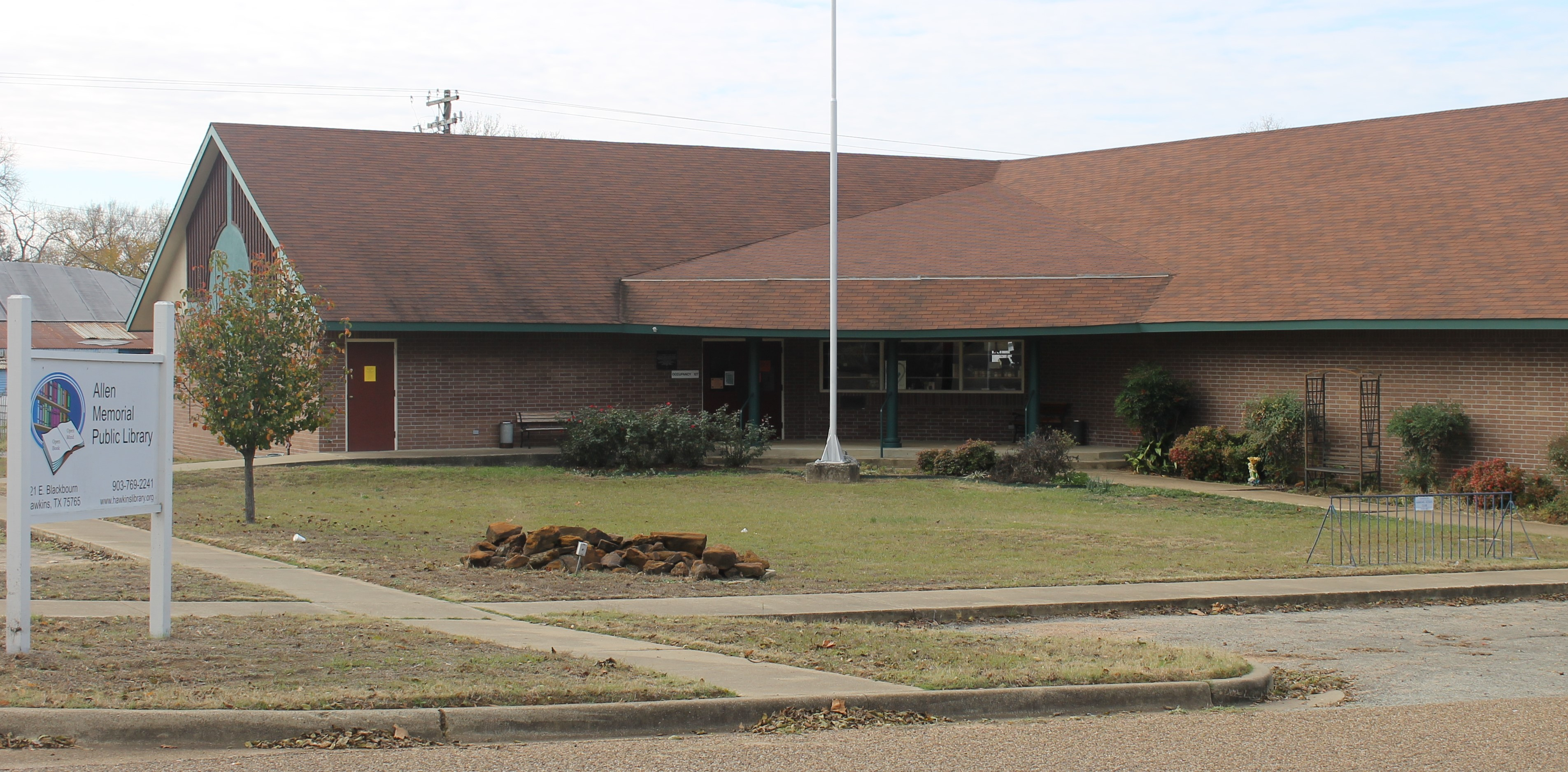
- Allen Memorial Public Library in Hawkins
- Nickname: The Pancake Capital of Texas
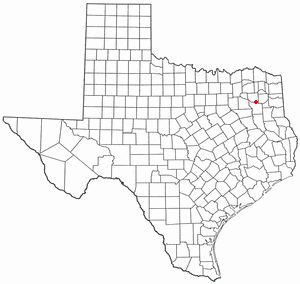
- Location of Hawkins, Texas

- Coordinates: 32°35′30″N 95°12′10″W
- Country: United States
- State: Texas
- County: Wood
- Established: 1941

Area
  - Total: 2.22 sq mi (5.75 km^{2})
  - Land: 2.20 sq mi (5.71 km^{2})
  - Water: 0.015 sq mi (0.04 km^{2})
- Elevation: 413 ft (126 m)

Population (2020)
  - Total: 1,274
  - Density: 598.9/sq mi (231.25/km^{2})
- Time zone: UTC-6 (Central (CST))
  - Summer (DST): UTC-5 (CDT)
- ZIP code: 75765
- Area code: 430, 903
- FIPS code: 48-32816
- GNIS feature ID: 2410718
- Website: https://www.hawkinstx.org/

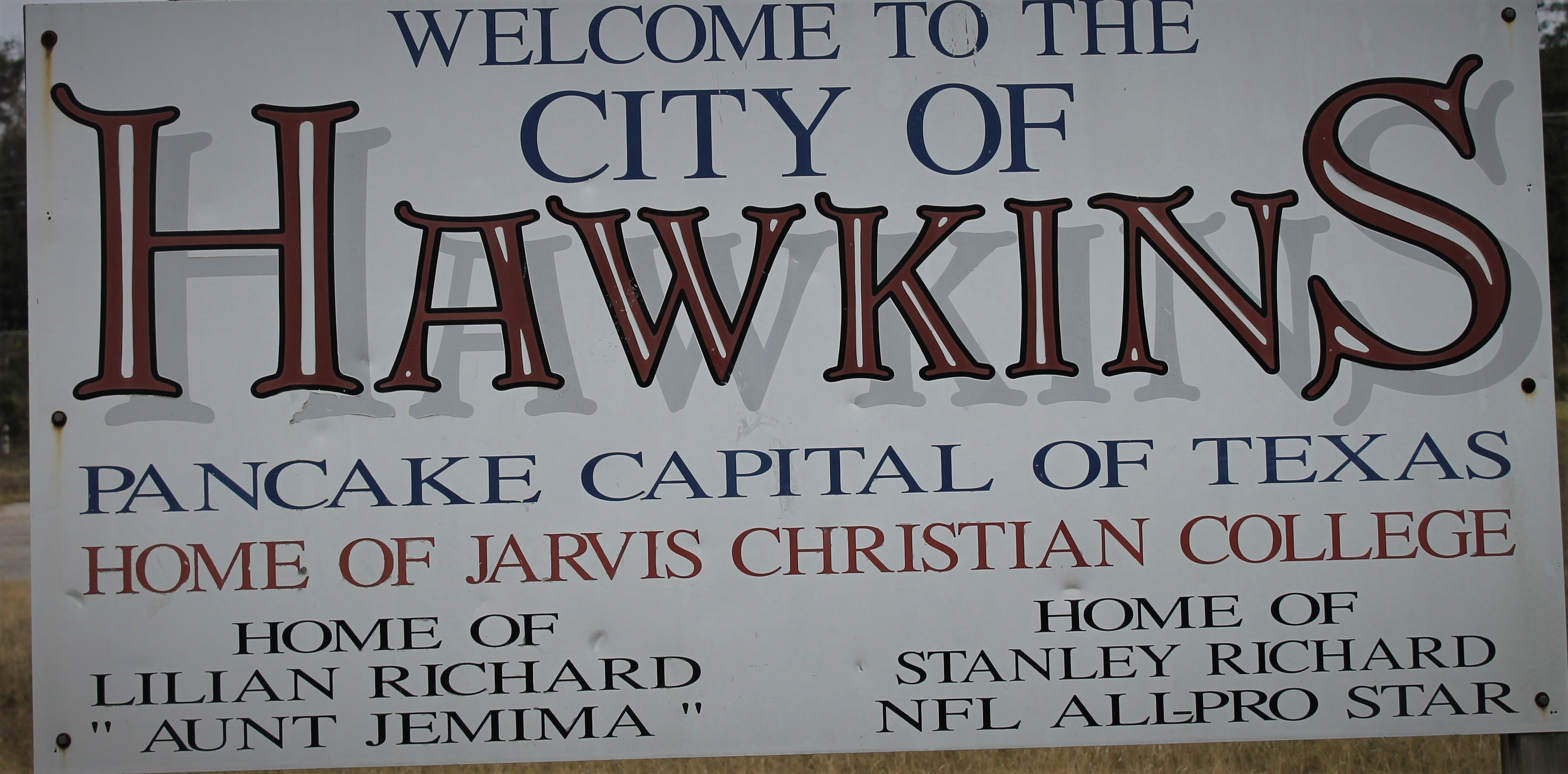
Hawkins advertises itself as the home of Jarvis Christian University and the "Pancake Capital of Texas" because it was the home of Lillian Richard, an African-American actress who portrayed "Aunt Jemima" for the Quaker Oats Company from 1925 to 1947.

Hawkins is a city in Wood County, Texas, United States. The population was 1,274 at the 2020 census. It is located twenty miles north of the larger city of Tyler. Just east of the community is Jarvis Christian University, a historically black institution of higher learning.

== History ==
A post office was established in Hawkins in 1873.

In 1995, Texas state senator David Cain introduced Senate Resolution No. 73 designating Hawkins as the "Pancake Capital of Texas", which was passed into law.

== Geography ==
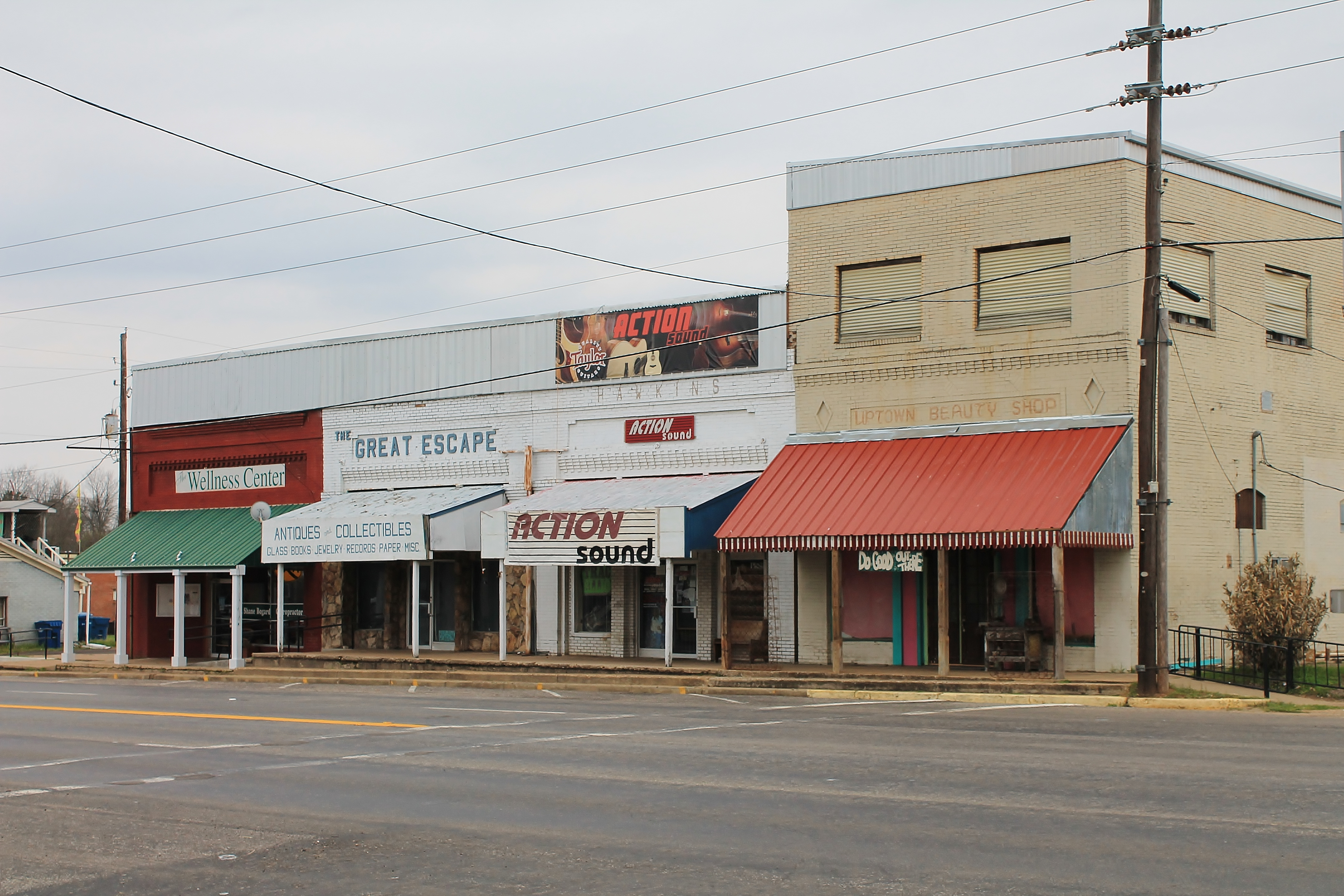
Downtown Hawkins (2014)

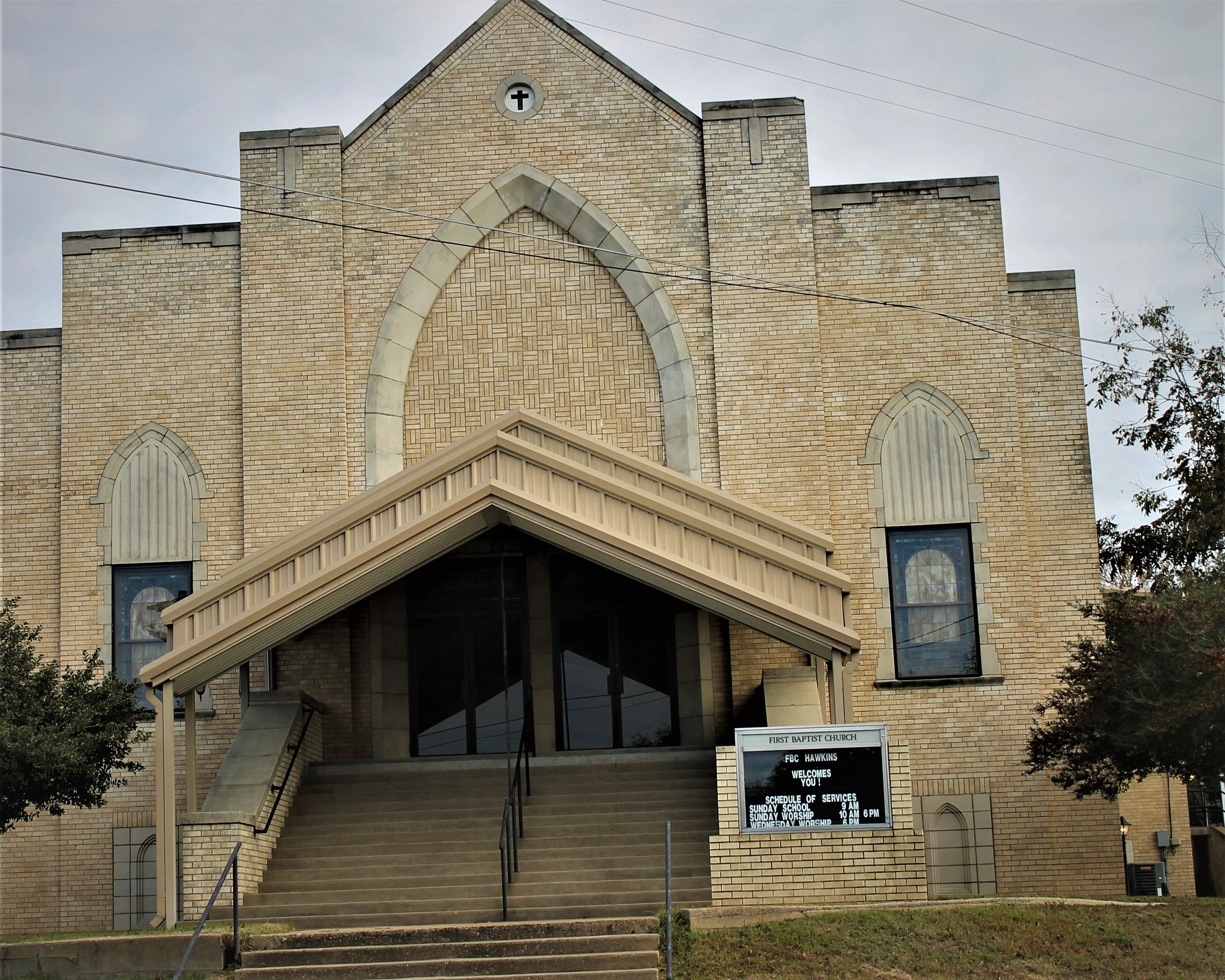
First Baptist Church of Hawkins (2024)

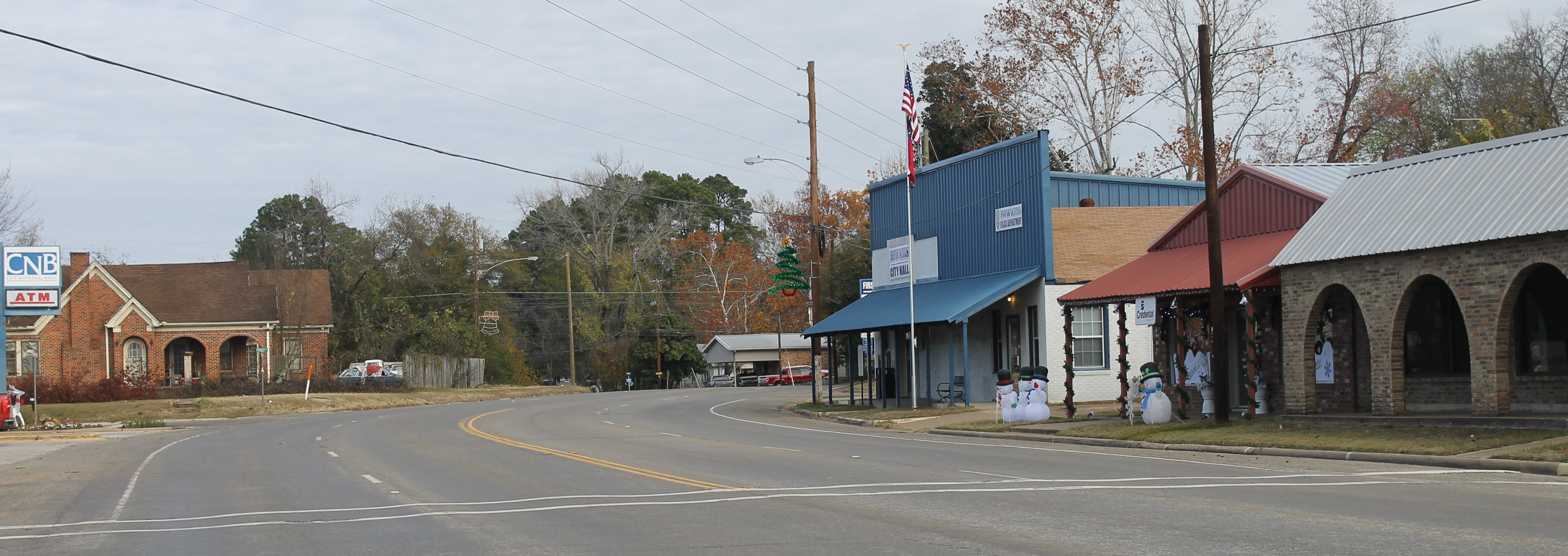
Another glimpse of Hawkins with City Hall in the blue building on the right (2016).

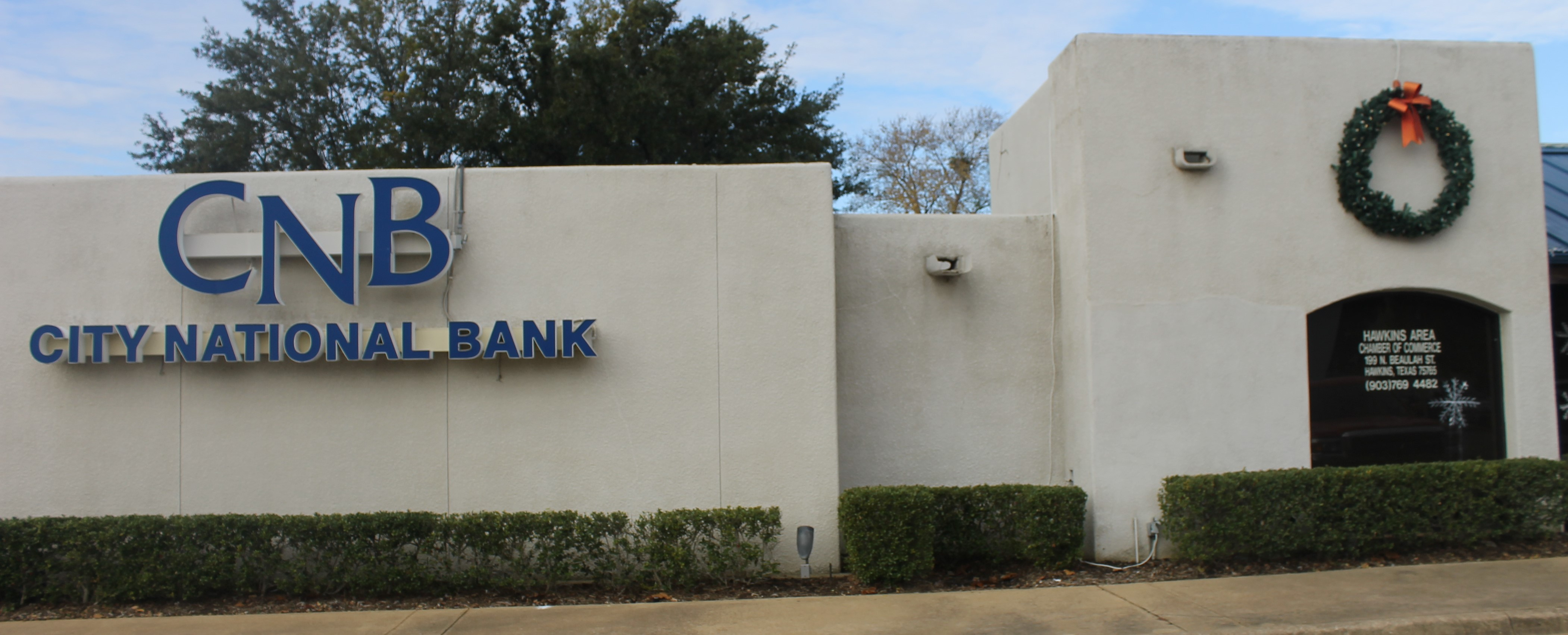
City National Bank in Hawkins

According to the United States Census Bureau, the city has a total area of 2.2 square miles (5.8 km^{2}), of which 2.2 square miles (5.8 km^{2}) is land and 0.44% is water.

Hawkins is located between Mineola (18 miles west of Hawkins) and Big Sandy (7 miles east) on U.S. Route 80. Most of Hawkins is along FM Road 14, which runs north and south. Quitman and the unincorporated community of Holly Lake Ranch are located to the north of Hawkins, while Interstate 20 and Tyler can be reached by traveling south from Hawkins on FM 14.

=== Climate ===
The climate in this area is characterized by hot, humid summers and generally mild to cool winters. According to the Köppen Climate Classification system, Hawkins has a humid subtropical climate, abbreviated "Cfa" on climate maps.

== Demographics ==
Historical population
Census	Pop.	Note	%±
1950	493		—
1960	868		76.1%
1970	977		12.6%
1980	1,302		33.3%
1990	1,309		0.5%
2000	1,331		1.7%
2010	1,278		−4.0%
2020	1,274		−0.3%
U.S. Decennial Census

As of the 2020 census, Hawkins had a population of 1,274 people.

=== 2020 census ===
As of the 2020 census, the median age in Hawkins was 37.5 years, 25.0% of residents were under the age of 18, and 17.2% were 65 years of age or older. For every 100 females, there were 90.7 males, and for every 100 females age 18 and over there were 89.7 males age 18 and over.

As of the 2020 census, 0.0% of residents lived in urban areas, while 100.0% lived in rural areas.

As of the 2020 census, there were 496 households in Hawkins, of which 33.3% had children under the age of 18 living in them. Of all households, 44.6% were married-couple households, 19.2% were households with a male householder and no spouse or partner present, and 27.8% were households with a female householder and no spouse or partner present. About 28.2% of all households were made up of individuals and 11.1% had someone living alone who was 65 years of age or older.

As of the 2020 census, there were 574 housing units, of which 13.6% were vacant. The homeowner vacancy rate was 3.4% and the rental vacancy rate was 6.5%.

Racial composition as of the 2020 census
Race	Number	Percent
White	980	76.9%
Black or African American	173	13.6%
American Indian and Alaska Native	3	0.2%
Asian	1	0.1%
Native Hawaiian and Other Pacific Islander	0	0.0%
Some other race	20	1.6%
Two or more races	97	7.6%
Hispanic or Latino (of any race)	65	5.1%

=== 2000 census ===
As of the census of 2000, there were 1,331 people, 492 households, and 358 families residing in the city. The population density was 593.1 inhabitants per square mile (229.0/km^{2}). There were 558 housing units at an average density of 248.6 per square mile (96.0/km^{2}). The racial makeup of the city was 82.79% White, 16.08% African American, 0.15% Native American, 0.23% from other races, and 0.75% from two or more races. Hispanic or Latino of any race were 0.98% of the population.

There were 492 households, out of which 34.3% had children under the age of 18 living with them, 53.9% were married couples living together, 14.8% had a female householder with no husband present, and 27.2% were non-families. 24.0% of all households were made up of individuals, and 13.4% had someone living alone who was 65 years of age or older. The average household size was 2.56 and the average family size was 3.05.

In the city, the population was spread out, with 26.0% under the age of 18, 8.3% from 18 to 24, 23.1% from 25 to 44, 25.4% from 45 to 64, and 17.1% who were 65 years of age or older. The median age was 39 years. For every 100 females, there were 78.9 males. For every 100 females age 18 and over, there were 76.2 males.

The median income for a household in the city was $32,543, and the median income for a family was $36,985. Males had a median income of $31,607 versus $19,800 for females. The per capita income for the city was $14,833. About 12.3% of families and 17.2% of the population were below the poverty line, including 19.8% of those under age 18 and 32.3% of those age 65 or over.

== Education ==
Hawkins is served by the Hawkins Independent School District.

Jarvis Christian University is located in unincorporated Wood County, Texas, east of Hawkins.

== Notable people ==
- Mel and Norma Gabler, launched a critique of public school textbooks from their kitchen table in Hawkins
- Lillian Richard, an African-American actress who played "Aunt Jemima" for the Quaker Oats Company
- Stanley Richard, great-nephew of Lillian Richard, played in the National Football League

== Area attractions ==
- Tyler State Park
- Lake Hawkins
