= Mrs. Butterworth's =

American brand of syrups and pancake mixes

- Product type: Syrup and baking mixes
- Current owner: Conagra Brands
- Country: United States
- Introduced: 1961
- Markets: Worldwide
- Previous owners: Mrs. Butterworth's
- Website: www.mrsbutterworths.com

Mrs. Butterworth's is an American brand of table syrups and pancake mixes owned by Conagra Brands. The syrups come in distinctive bottles shaped as the character "Mrs. Butterworth", represented in the form of a "matronly" woman. The syrup was introduced in 1961. In 1999, the original glass bottles began to be replaced with plastic. In 2009, the character was given the first name "Joy" following a contest held by the company.

== Advertising ==
One of the main voice actresses for Mrs. Butterworth was Mary Kay Bergman. She was also voiced by Hope Summers during the early to late 1970s.

Chicago actress Mercita DeMonk also voiced Mrs. Butterworth at times.

Kim Fields appeared in a commercial for the product during the late 1970s.

In 2007, Mrs. Butterworth was used in a series of ads for GEICO, in which she helped an actual customer with her testimonial.

In 2019, Mrs Butterworth appeared along with an actor playing Colonel Sanders in a KFC commercial spoofing a scene from Dirty Dancing, promoting chicken and waffles using Mrs. Butterworth's syrup.

== Controversy ==
Examples of the design of a Mrs. Butterworth's bottle. These in particular were created for Stop & Shop's 100th anniversary.

In 2020, following protests over systemic racism, Conagra Brands announced that it would review the shape of their bottles, as critics viewed them as an example of the "mammy" stereotype. A competing brand, Aunt Jemima, revamped its brand and advertising following the attention on negative black stereotypes. In ads, Mrs. Butterworth's voice has evoked a grandmotherly white woman, and she has been portrayed by white voice actresses. Despite this, some reports had said that the character was originally modeled on Butterfly McQueen, a black actress who appeared as a maid in Gone with the Wind (1939), and that the dark brown color of the syrup inside the bottle gave the impression that the character was black.

As of 2026, the Mrs. Butterworth’s bottle shape had not been changed.

== In popular culture ==
In season 9, episode 15 of Friends, Joey says that the reason he buys Mrs. Butterworth’s is because of her big bosom.

In 2005, Chicago rapper Lupe Fiasco made reference to the brand on Kanye West's "Touch the Sky," with the lyric "bottle-shaped body like Mrs. Butterworth".

In 2009, then-parent company Pinnacle Foods held a "first name contest" for the product's spokesperson; the winning name was "Joy", making the full name Joy Butterworth. The character appears in the 2012 American film Foodfight!, voiced by Edie McClurg.

In 2013, during episode 12 of the ninth season of Whose Line Is It Anyway?, Ryan Stiles uses comedian Nyima Funk as a bottle of Mrs. Butterworth's to pour onto Colin Mochrie's imaginary waffles during a game of "Living Scenery".

In 2017, she made a cameo appearance in the Family Guy episode "A House Full of Peters".

== See also ==
- Breakfast
- French toast
- List of syrups
- Waffles
- Betty Crocker
