= Chris L. Rutt =

American newspaper managing editor (1859–1936)

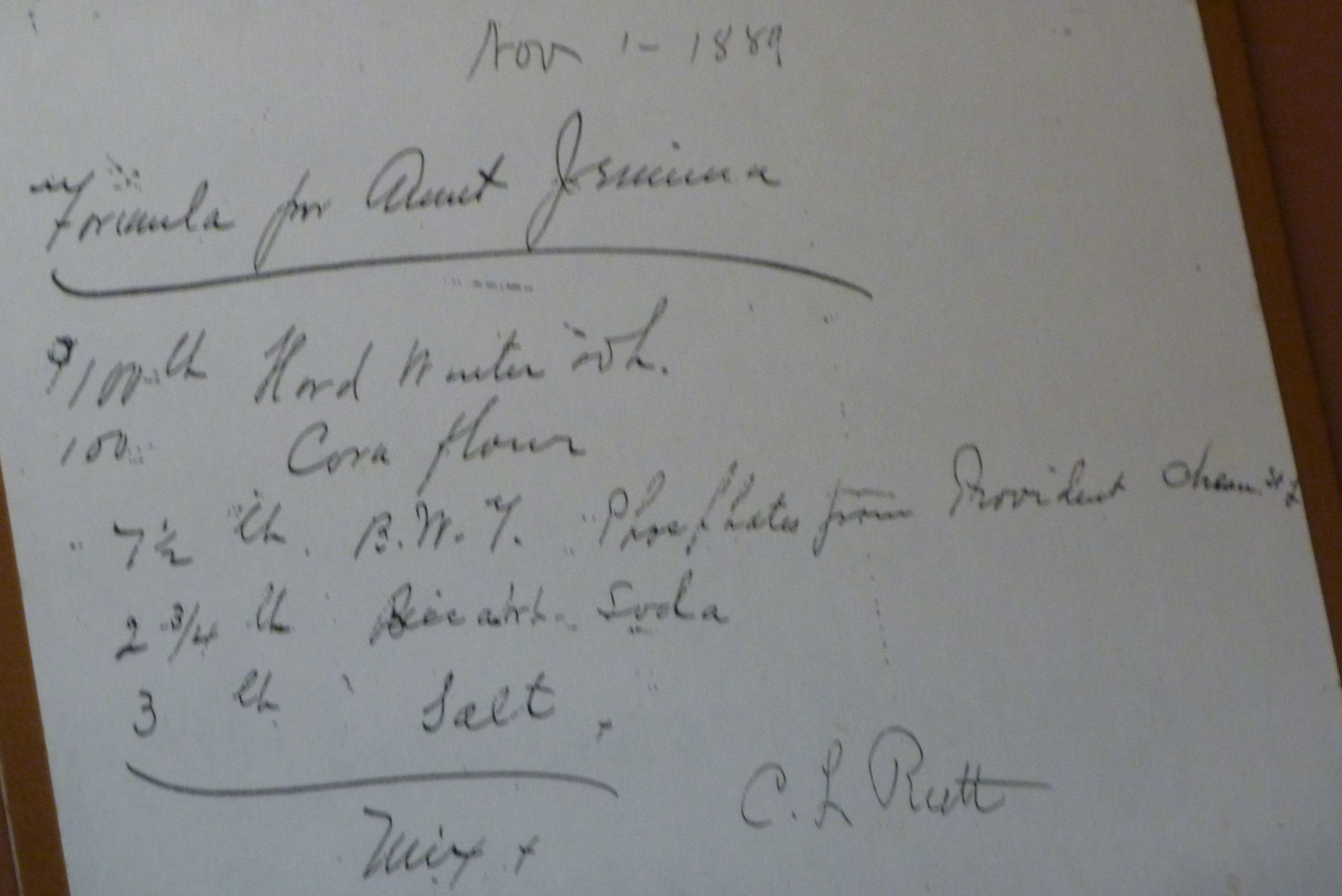
Rutt's recipe for Aunt Jemima on November 1, 1889, on display at the Patee House Museum

Christian Ludwig Rutt (October 8, 1859 – 1936) was a managing editor for the St. Joseph News-Press who is credited with coming up with the recipe and name for Aunt Jemima pancakes.

Rutt was born in Milwaukee, Wisconsin. In 1865 he moved with his parents to Atchison, Kansas, where he attended St. Benedict's College (now Benedictine College). He worked for several years at newspapers in Leavenworth, Kansas, and Texas.

He moved to St. Joseph, Missouri, in 1885, where he worked for the St. Joseph Gazette, working for John N. Edwards.

In 1889, he attended a white minstrel show where the song "Old Aunt Jemima" was being performed. The minstrels had red bandanas in their hair, and wore aprons. He and Charles Underwood had recently bought the Pearl Milling company in St. Joseph. They trademarked the image. Unable to make it work, they sold to the R.T. Davis Milling Company in St. Joseph. Davis would hire Nancy Green to portray the character at the World's Columbian Exposition in 1893.

In 1900, he was made editor for the Gazette. In 1902, he became managing editor of the Daily News, which would become the News-Press. According to St. Joseph newspaper lore, at one point he would write an article in the morning Gazette and then refute it in the afternoon News.

Rutt continued as editor until his death in 1936.
