= Lillian Richard =

African-American actress (1891–1956)

- Born: March 23, 1891; Hawkins, Texas, U.S.
- Died: July 2, 1956 (aged 65)
- Occupation: Actress
- Relatives: Stanley Richard (grand-nephew)

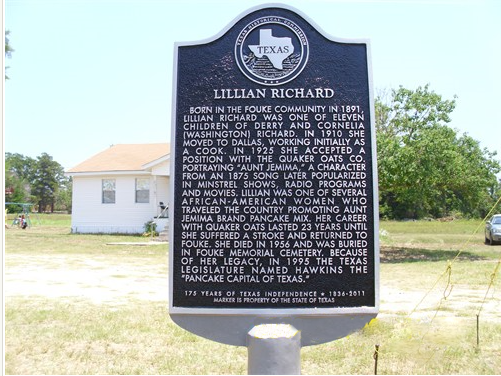
Historical marker dedicated to Lillian Richard

Lillian Richard (March 23, 1891 – July 2, 1956) was an African-American actress best known for portraying Aunt Jemima.

== Biography ==
She was born March 23, 1891, in Hawkins, Texas, the fifth of eleven children born to Derry Richard and his wife Cornelia (née Washington). She grew up in the nearby community of Fouke, Texas. One of her siblings was George Richard, grandfather of Stanley Richard, a retired safety for the San Diego Chargers and the Washington Redskins.

In 1910, Richard went to Dallas, working initially as a cook. Circa 1912, she married Golden Leflore, who died roughly two years later of tuberculosis.

In 1925, she was contracted by Quaker Oats Company to portray the Aunt Jemima character, demonstrating pancakes and other products. Her job "pitching pancakes" was based in Paris, Texas. She married James Diggs in 1935.

Her career with Quaker Oats lasted 23 years. After she suffered a stroke circa 1947–1948, she returned to Fouke. Relatives cared for her until her 1956 death. She outlived her husband, and had no children.

In 1995, the Texas Legislature passed a resolution declaring Hawkins the "Pancake Capital of Texas". A Texas Historical Marker was placed in Richard's name on June 30, 2012.
