= Stanley Richard =

American football player (born 1967)

No. 24
- Position: Safety

Personal information
- Born: October 21, 1967 (age 59); Mineola, Texas, U.S.
- Listed height: 6 ft 2 in (1.88 m)
- Listed weight: 198 lb (90 kg)

Career information
- High school: Hawkins (Hawkins, Texas)
- College: Texas
- NFL draft: 1991: 1st round, 9th overall pick

Career history
- San Diego Chargers (1991–1994); Washington Redskins (1995–1998)

Awards and highlights
- PFWA All-Rookie Team (1991); First-team All-American (1990); SWC Defensive Player of the Year (1990); First-team All-SWC (1990)

Career NFL statistics
- Tackles: 682
- Interceptions: 21
- Forced fumbles: 4
- Stats at Pro Football Reference

Stanley Palmer Richard (born October 21, 1967), nicknamed "the Sheriff", is an American former professional football player who was a safety for eight seasons in the National Football League (NFL) for the San Diego Chargers and Washington Redskins. He played college football for the Texas Longhorns, earning first-team All-American honors in 1990. In the NFL, he was the starting strong safety for the Chargers in Super Bowl XXIX.

== Early life ==
Richard was born in Mineola, Texas and played football at nearby Hawkins High School in Hawkins, where he was selected as an all-state player.

== College career ==
Richard played college football at the University of Texas from 1987 to 1990, where he was the team's MVP, UPI's Southwest Conference's Defensive Player of the Year, All-Southwest Conference, a UPI All-American Honorable Mention and an AP First Team All-American safety in 1990. He helped lead the Longhorns to a conference championship and a #3 ranking going into the Cotton Bowl where they had a shot at the National Championship.

In 2004, he was inducted into the Texas Longhorn's Hall of Honor.

== Professional career ==
Richard was drafted ninth overall by the San Diego Chargers in the 1991 NFL draft and played with the Chargers from 1991 to 1994. He was a late holdout coming into the 1991 season, but still started the first game of the season for San Diego. Richard showed promise in his rookie season, and finished fourth in voting for the AP Defensive Rookie of the year, losing to Mike Croel, and made the All-Rookie team. In 1994, he had four interceptions, including a 99-yarder for a TD, the longest one of the season, and came in second in the league for interception return yards and interceptions returned for a TD, as he helped the team to Super Bowl XXIX. Following that season, he was signed by the Washington Redskins as an unrestricted free agent on March 10, 1995, and played with the Redskins from 1995 to 1998. In 1995, he was named Defensive Player of the Week in week 14. Richard retired following the 1998 season. He had 21 career interceptions returned for 352 yards and two touchdowns in 124 starts.

Richard returned to the University of Texas and earned his degree in Applied Learning & Development in 2020. He currently resides in Hawkins, Texas where he owns a 300-acre cattle ranch.

== NFL career statistics ==
Legend
	Led the league
**Bold**	Career high

Year	Team	Games		Tackles				Interceptions				Fumbles			
Year	Team	GP	GS	Comb	Solo	Ast	Sck	Int	Yds	TD	Lng	FF	FR	Yds	TD
1991	SDG	15	14	59	59	0	0.0	2	5	0	3	**1**	0	0	0
1992	SDG	14	14	79	79	0	0.0	3	26	0	20	0	**1**	0	0
1993	SDG	**16**	**16**	77	77	0	**2.0**	1	-2	0	-2	**1**	**1**	0	0
1994	SDG	**16**	**16**	79	69	10	0.0	**4**	**224**	**2**	**99**	**1**	0	0	0
1995	WAS	**16**	**16**	94	82	12	0.0	3	24	0	24	0	**1**	0	0
1996	WAS	**16**	15	106	82	24	0.0	3	47	0	42	**1**	0	0	0
1997	WAS	**16**	**16**	**126**	**98**	**28**	0.0	**4**	28	0	23	0	**1**	0	0
1998	WAS	15	15	62	46	16	0.0	1	0	0	0	0	**1**	0	0
		124	122	682	592	90	2.0	21	352	2	99	4	5	0	0

== See also ==
- List of Texas Longhorns football All-Americans
- List of Los Angeles Chargers first-round draft picks
