= Brown rice syrup =

Sweetener derived from rice

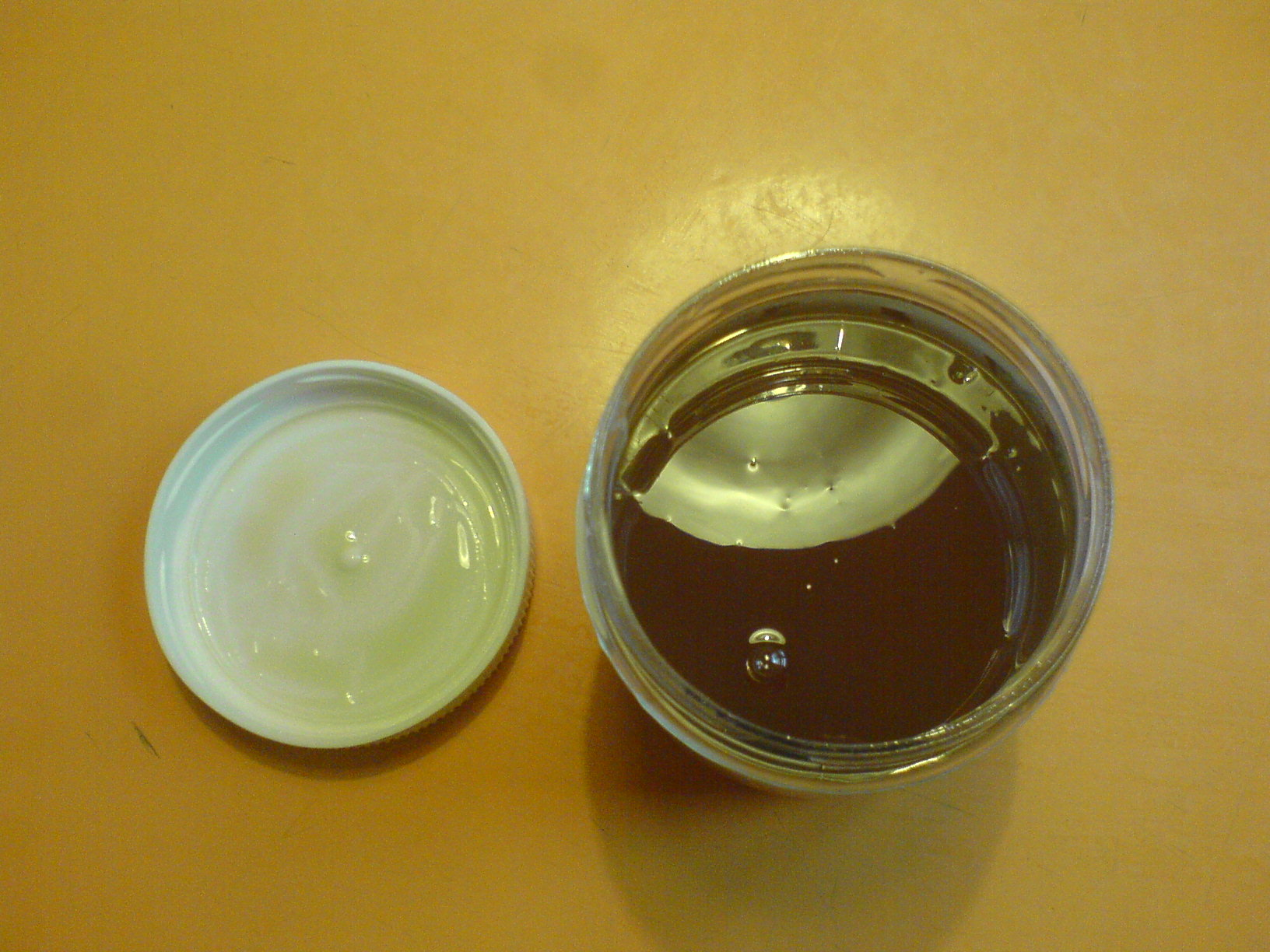
- Rice syrup

Korean name
- Hangul: 물엿; 조청
- Hanja: (none); 造淸
- RR: mullyeot; jocheong
- MR: mullyŏt; choch'ŏng
- IPA: [mul.ljʌt̚]; [tɕo.tɕʰʌŋ]

Brown rice (malt) syrup, also known as rice syrup or rice malt, is a sweetener which is rich in compounds categorized as sugars and is derived by steeping cooked rice starch with saccharifying enzymes to break down the starches, followed by straining off the liquid and reducing it by evaporative heating until the desired consistency is reached. The enzymes used in the saccharification step are supplied by an addition of sprouted barley grains to the rice starch (the traditional method) or by adding bacterial-derived or fungal-derived purified enzyme isolates (the modern, industrialized method).

== Production ==
In traditional practices, brown rice syrup is created by adding a small amount of sprouted barley grains (barley malt) to cooked, whole brown rice in a solution of heated water, similar to the production of beer wort. The enzymes supplied by the barley malt digest the carbohydrates, proteins and lipids to produce a sweet solution rich in simple carbohydrates with minor amounts of amino acid, peptides and lipids. The solution is strained off the grains and boiled to evaporate and concentrate the liquid to produce a low water syrup suitable for use as a sugar substitute. Such syrups are high in the simple sugar maltose and low in glucose and fructose, due to the enzymatic action of beta- and alpha amylase on starch supplied by the sprouted barley. These enzymes produce large amounts of maltose from starch digestion and generate very little glucose or fructose in the process.

The modern, commercial preparation of brown rice syrup differs slightly. The ingredients consist of 100% modified rice starch generated by processing brown rice to remove the protein, hemicellulose and lipid fractions. The modification usually involves heat-assisted liquefaction of brown rice with enzyme isolates to produce a solution full of solubilised dextrins (derived from the breakdown of starch) and heat coagulated protein-hemicellulose-lipid complexes. The undesirable components are easily separated and recovered as a separate food stuff or agro-residue, leaving a solution of nearly pure rice dextrins. A product similar to the rice-dextrin (modified starch) produced by this step is often sold under the name of malto-dextrin, but this commercial product often employs corn or wheat flour rather than rice.

The rice-dextrin solution then undergoes a further heat-assisted saccharification step involving the addition of further enzyme isolates, which convert the complex carbohydrates (rice-dextrins) into a solution rich in the simple carbohydrate maltose. The solution is then partially evaporated by boiling, until the final desired water content of the syrup is achieved. Brown rice syrup generated by this process is protein, fibre (hemicellulose) and lipid free and usually consists of 65–85% maltose, 10–15% maltotriose, 5–20% dextrins and only 2–3% glucose. The final carbohydrate mix of brown rice syrups can be controlled and adjusted by the manufacturer.

The enzymes used in the liquefaction step are usually alpha-amylases derived from bacterial or fungal bioreactors (Bacillus species or Aspergillus species are the most commonly used microbe engines in the bioreactors). These convert starch into dextrins of various molecular sizes and the modified starch end product is usually given an appropriate DE (dextrose equivalent) rating to signify the degree of starch conversion and the quantity of reducing sugars produced in the process. The enzymes used in the saccharification step are the amylolytic enzyme, beta-amylase (usually derived from Bacillus species) and the debranching enzyme, pullulanase (derived from Aerobacter species). These convert the dextrinised starch into simple carbohydrates (sugars) and lower-molecular-weight dextrins.

The modern industrial production of brown rice syrup does not involve the use of synthetic chemicals in the modification of flour and starch. The enzymes added in processing are naturally derived from organic bioreactors using methods similar to the creation of antibiotics.

Brown rice syrup is readily available in most western Chinese grocery stores as maltose or maltose syrup, in reference to the high maltose content of the sweetener. This product is almost always produced by the industrialized method.

Rice syrup has a shelf life of about a year, and once opened, should be stored in a cool, dry place.

Brown rice syrup is the sweetener found in some drinks, such as rice milk.

Brown rice syrup is produced on a commercial scale by several companies in the United States, Europe, and Asia.

== Glycemic index ==
Brown rice syrup (BRS) has a glycemic index (GI) of 98 which is higher than table sugar (65) and about the same as glucose (100), the sugar used as the baseline to measure other foods against.

== Toxic impurities ==
Brown rice syrup and products containing it were found in a 2012 study to contain significant levels of arsenic, which is toxic to humans. This is presumably due to the high prevalence of arsenic in rice. The authors recommended that regulators establish legal limits for arsenic levels in food, particularly in infant and toddler formulas.

== See also ==
- Amazake – Japanese drink made from fermented rice
- Barley malt syrup – Food additive
- Corn syrup – Syrup made from corn used as food additive
- Glucose syrup – Syrup made from the hydrolysis of starch
- List of syrups
- Mizuame – Japanese starch-based sweetener
- Yeot – Traditional Korean confectionary
