= Wallace, South Carolina =

- Unincorporated community & census-designated place
- Wallace in 2023

- Location within the state of South Carolina
- Coordinates: 34°43′07″N 79°51′42″W
- Country: United States
- State: South Carolina
- County: Marlboro

Area
  - Total: 6.69 sq mi (17.33 km^{2})
  - Land: 6.58 sq mi (17.03 km^{2})
  - Water: 0.12 sq mi (0.30 km^{2})
- Elevation: 108 ft (33 m)

Population (2020)
  - Total: 843
  - Density: 128.2/sq mi (49.51/km^{2})
- Time zone: UTC-5 (Eastern (EST))
  - Summer (DST): UTC-4 (EDT)
- ZIP codes: 29596
- Area code: 7866
- FIPS code: 45-74140
- GNIS feature ID: 2629838

Wallace is a census-designated place and unincorporated community in northwestern Marlboro County, South Carolina, United States. It lies at the intersection of U.S. Route 1 with SC 9 and SC 177, northwest of the city of Bennettsville, the county seat of Marlboro County.

Although Wallace is unincorporated, it has a post office, with the ZIP code of 29596; the ZCTA for ZIP code 29596 had a population of 2,606 at the 2000 census.

Pegues Place was listed on the National Register of Historic Places in 1971.

== Demographics ==
Historical population
| Census | Pop. | Note | %± |
|---|---|---|---|
| 2020 | 843 | | — |
U.S. Decennial Census
