= Pegues Place =

Historic house in South Carolina, United States

- U.S. National Register of Historic Places
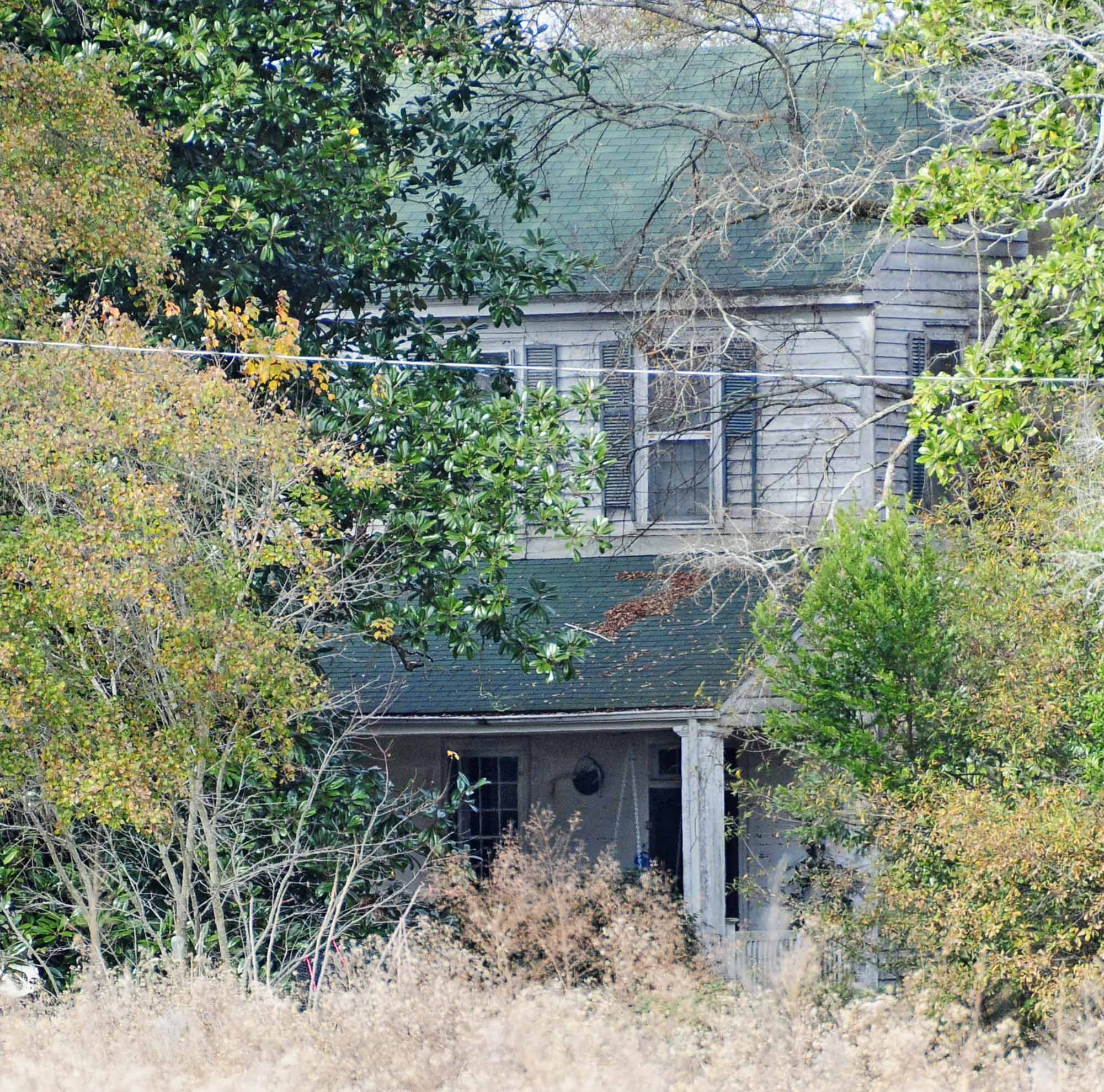
- Pegues Place, December 2012

- Location within South Carolina Location within the United States
- Location: North of Wallace, off U.S. Route 1, near Wallace, South Carolina
- Coordinates: 34°48′02″N 79°54′40″W
- Area: 14 acres (5.7 ha)
- Built: c. 1770
- NRHP reference No.: 71000790
- Added to NRHP: January 25, 1971

Pegues Place, also known as the Claudius Pegues House, is a historic home located near Wallace, Marlboro County, South Carolina. It was built about 1770, and is a two-story Georgian white frame house with a one-story, full façade porch. A wing was added in the late-19th century. Also on the property are contributing barns, a cotton gin, wash house, log smoke house, carriage house, and greenhouse. On May 3, 1781, it was the site of the only agreement for the exchange of prisoners of war signed by Lt. Col. Edward Carrington (for Gen. Nathanael Greene) and Capt. Frederick Cornwallis (for Gen. Earl Cornwallis).

It was listed on the National Register of Historic Places in 1971.
