= Corn syrup =

Syrup made from corn used as food additive

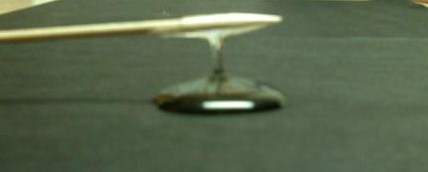

Corn syrup is a food syrup that is made from the starch of corn (maize) and contains varying amounts of sugars: glucose, maltose and higher oligosaccharides, depending on the grade. Corn syrup is used in foods to soften texture, add volume, prevent crystallization of sugar, and enhance flavor. Most table syrups typically consist primarily of corn syrup. It can be processed into high-fructose corn syrup (HFCS) by using the enzyme D-xylose isomerase to convert a large proportion of its glucose into sweeter fructose.

The more general term glucose syrup is often used synonymously with corn syrup, since glucose syrup in the United States is most commonly made from corn starch. Technically, glucose syrup is any liquid starch hydrolysate of mono-, di-, and higher-saccharides and can be made from any source of starch: wheat, tapioca and potatoes are the most common other sources.

== History ==
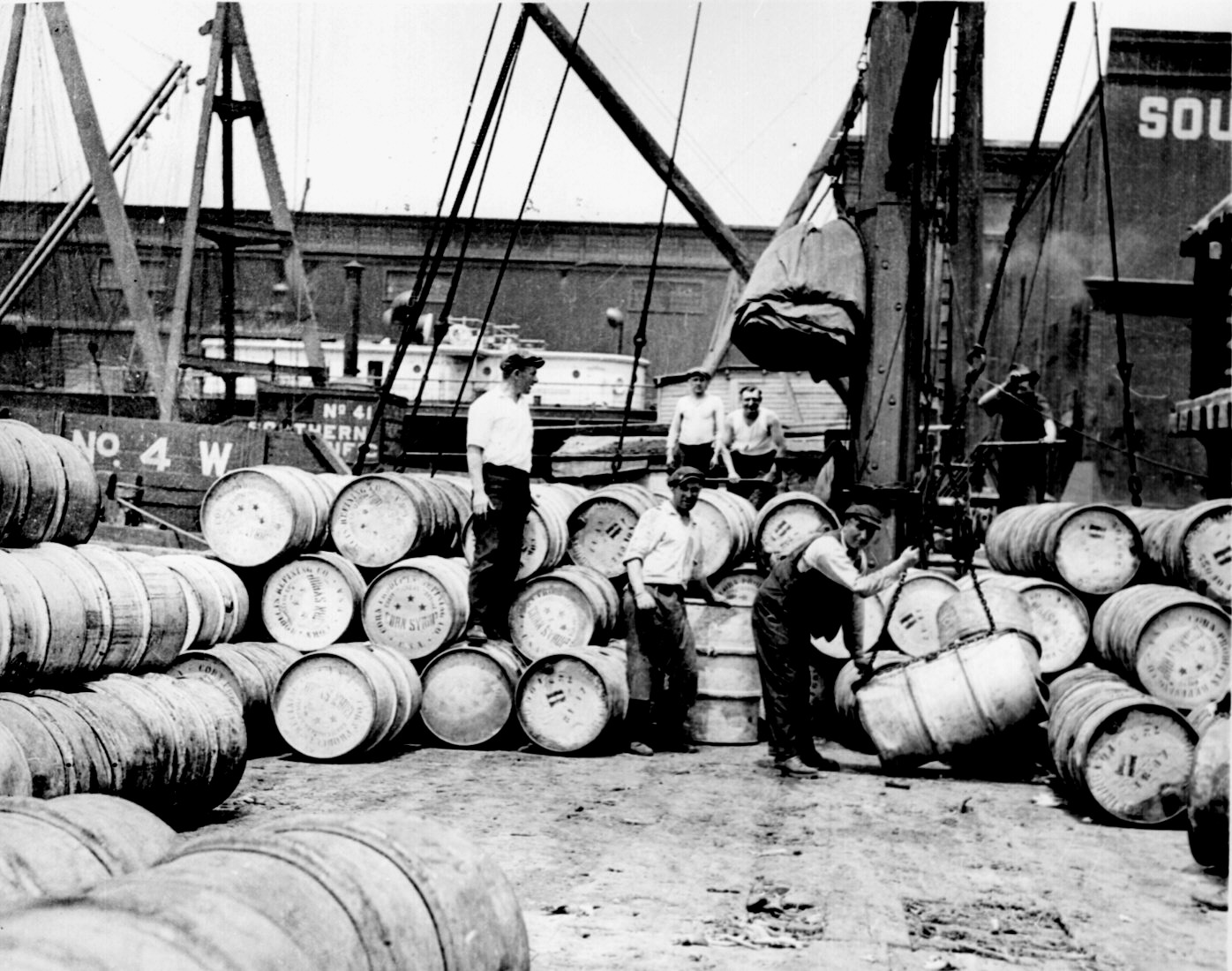
Stevedores load a barge with barrels of corn syrup, 1912.

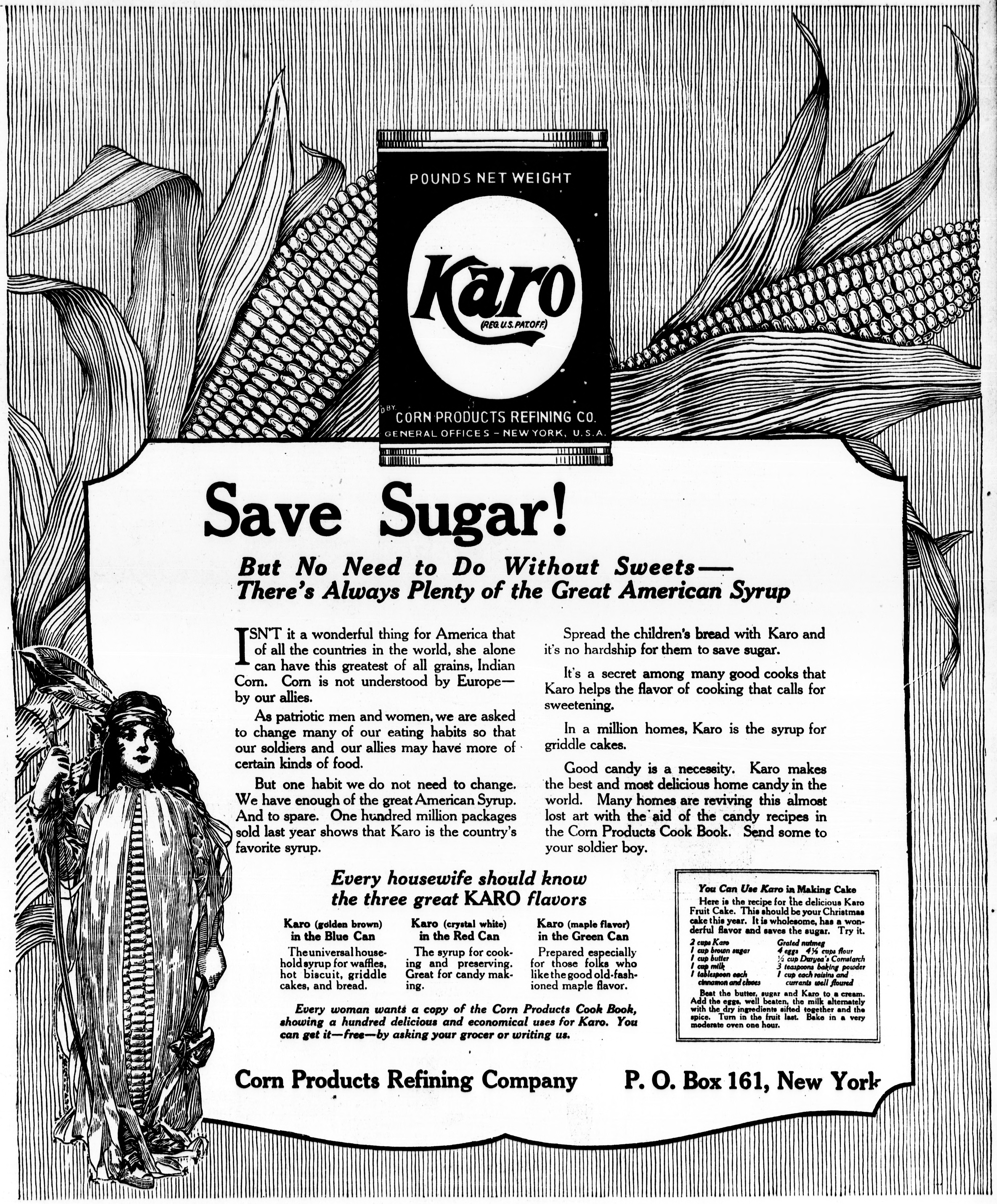
1917 Karo advertisement encouraging corn syrup as a wartime sugar substitute

Corn syrup was available at American grocery stores in the 19th century, as a generic product sold from a barrel. In 1902, the Corn Products Refining Company introduced clear, bottled corn syrup under the brand name of Karo Syrup. In 1910, the company launched one of the largest advertising campaigns ever seen. This included full-page advertisements in women's magazines and free cookbooks full of recipes that called for Karo brand corn syrup. In the 1930s, they promoted a new pecan pie recipe that featured corn syrup, followed by a similar, nut-free chess pie recipe, in a bid to drive sales. Later, they promoted it as an alternative to maple syrup for waffles. As cooking in the home declined in the 21st century, so that fewer people made candies or pies at home, commercial sales of Karo tended to dominate over the retail sales.

== Commercial preparation ==
A railroad tank car carrying corn syrup

Historically, corn syrup was produced by combining corn starch with dilute hydrochloric acid, and then heating the mixture under pressure. The process was invented by the German chemist Gottlieb Kirchhoff in 1811. Currently, corn syrup is obtained through a multi-step bioprocess. First, the enzyme α-amylase is added to a mixture of corn starch and water. α-amylase is secreted by various species of the bacterium genus Bacillus and is isolated from the liquid in which the bacteria were grown. The enzyme breaks down the starch into oligosaccharides, which are then broken into glucose molecules by adding the enzyme glucoamylase, known also as "γ-amylase". Glucoamylase is secreted by various species of the fungus Aspergillus; the enzyme is isolated from the liquid in which the fungus is grown. The glucose can then be transformed into fructose by passing the glucose through a column that is loaded with the enzyme D-xylose isomerase, an enzyme that is isolated from the growth medium of any of several bacteria.

Corn syrup is produced from number 2 yellow dent corn. When wet milled, about 2.3 litres of corn are required to yield an average of 947 g of starch, to produce 1 kg of glucose syrup. A bushel (25 kg) of corn will yield an average of 31.5 pounds (14.3 kg) of starch, which in turn will yield about 33.3 pounds (15.1 kg) of syrup. Thus, it takes about 2,300 litres of corn to produce a tonne of glucose syrup, or 60 bushels (1524 kg) of corn to produce one short ton.

The viscosity and sweetness of the syrup depends on the extent to which the hydrolysis reaction has been carried out. To distinguish different grades of syrup, they are rated according to their dextrose equivalent (DE). Most commercially available corn syrups are approximately 1/3 glucose by weight.

Two common commercial corn syrup products are light and dark corn syrup.

- Light corn syrup is corn syrup seasoned with vanilla flavor and salt. It is a nearly clear color.
- Dark corn syrup is a combination of corn syrup and refiner's syrup, caramel color and flavor, salt, and the preservative sodium benzoate. Its color is dark brown.

== Uses ==
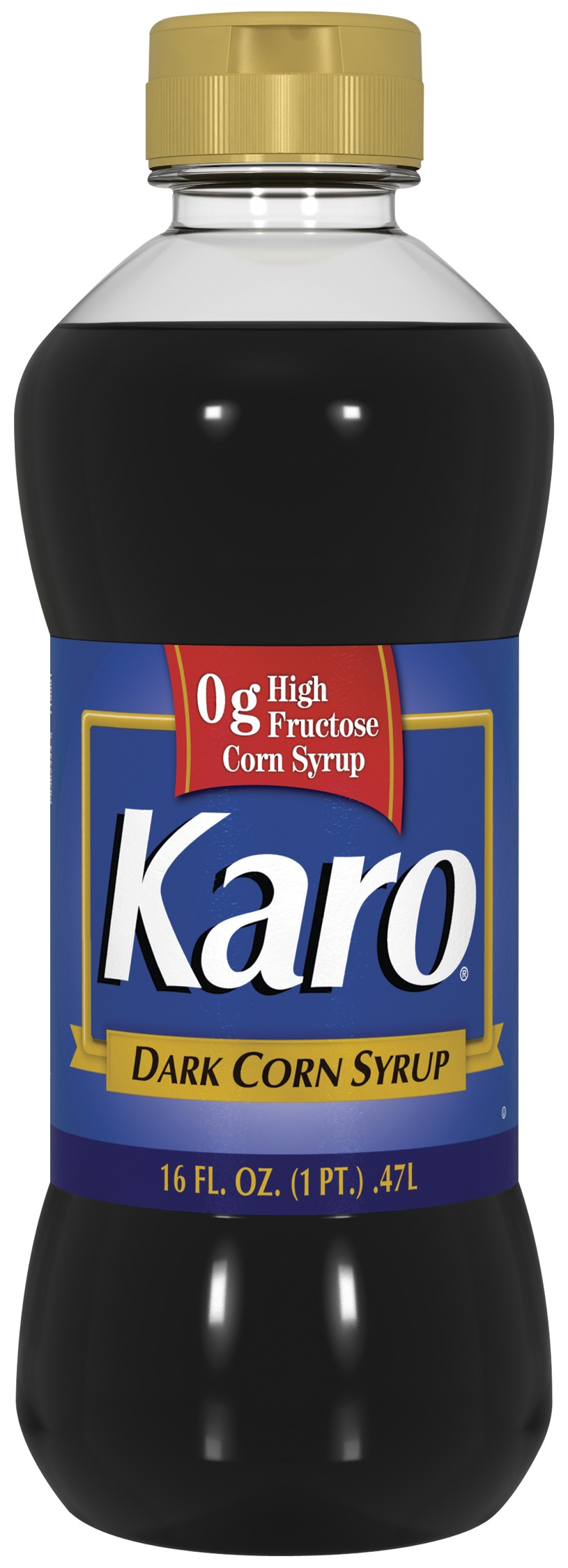
A bottle of dark corn syrup

Major uses of corn syrup in commercially prepared foods are as a thickener, a sweetener, and a humectant (an ingredient that retains moisture and thus maintains a food's freshness). The primary ingredient in most brands of commercial "table syrup" is either regular corn syrup or high-fructose corn syrup, both of which are less expensive than maple syrup.

In the United States, tariff-rate quotas for cane sugar imports raise sugar prices; hence, domestically produced corn syrup and high-fructose corn syrup are less costly alternatives that are often used in American-made processed and mass-produced foods, candies, soft drinks, and fruit drinks.

Glucose syrup was the primary corn sweetener in the United States prior to the expanded use of high-fructose corn syrup production in 1964. HFCS is a variant in which other enzymes are used to convert some of the glucose into fructose. The resulting syrup is sweeter and more soluble.

If mixed with sugar, water, and cream of tartar, corn syrup can be used to make sugar glass.

== See also ==
- Candy corn
- High-maltose corn syrup
- List of syrups
