= John Stuart (CEO) =

American businessman, CEO of the Quaker Oats Company

John Stuart (1877–1969) was an American businessman who served as the chief executive officer of the Quaker Oats Company from 1922 to 1953.

== Early life and education ==
Stuart was born in Chicago in 1877, the son of Robert Stuart and Margaret Shearer. He was educated at the University of Chicago Laboratory Schools. As a teenager, he worked in his father's mill in Cedar Rapids, Iowa, sweeping floors. After high school, he attended Princeton University, graduating in 1900.

In 1901, he won the first Trans-Mississippi Amateur golf tournament at the Kansas City Country Club.

== Career ==
In 1899, Stuart's father and business partner Henry Parsons Crowell used a proxy fight to gain control of the American Cereal Company from Ferdinand Schumacher. In 1901, they renamed the company the Quaker Oats Company, drawing on the brand established by Crowell's Quaker Mill Company.

In 1907, at the age of 30, Stuart was named a director of Quaker Oats and soon became thoroughly acquainted with the business.

Stuart became CEO in 1922 at age 43. His brother, R. Douglas Stuart, assumed marketing responsibilities from Crowell shortly afterward. Under Stuart's leadership, the company introduced products such as Puffed Wheat and Puffed Rice, purchased Aunt Jemima in 1925, and diversified into pet food with the acquisition of Ken-L Ration in 1942 and Puss 'n Boots in 1950. He stepped down in 1953, succeeded by Donold Lourie.

== Other activities ==
Stuart also served on the boards of International Harvester, the Canadian Imperial Bank of Commerce, the Pennsylvania Railroad, and Northern Trust. He was a trustee of both Princeton University and the University of Chicago.

In 1947, at the request of President Harry S. Truman, Stuart was appointed to the Hoover Commission.

== Personal life ==
Stuart married Ellen Shumway, with whom he had two daughters and a son, John Stuart Jr.

== Death ==
Stuart died at Lake Forest Hospital in Lake Forest, Illinois, on December 26, 1969.
