= John Stuart =

John or Johnny Stuart may refer to:

== Arts and entertainment ==
- Sir John James Stuart of Allanbank (1779–1849), Scottish painter
- John Stuart (actor) (1898–1979), Scottish actor
- Johnny Stuart (author) (1940–2003), Scottish expert on Russian art

== Law and politics ==
- John Stuart, 3rd Earl of Bute (1713–1792), British prime minister
- John Stuart (loyalist) (1718–1779), British superintendent of Indian Affairs in America
- John Stuart, 1st Marquess of Bute (1744–1814), British nobleman and politician
- Sir John Stuart, 4th Baronet (c. 1752–1821), Scottish MP for Kincardineshire
- John Stuart (Nova Scotia politician) (1752–1835), Canadian lawyer and politician
- John Stuart, Lord Mount Stuart (1767–1794), Scottish politician
- John Stuart (judge) (1793–1876), British MP and judge
- John Stuart, 12th Earl of Moray (1797–1867), Scottish soldier and politician
- John T. Stuart (1807–1885), American politician
- John Stuart (Canadian politician) (1830–1913), Canadian MP

== Military ==
- John Stuart (Virginia settler) (1749–1823), American revolutionary war commander
- John Stuart (British Army officer, born 1759) (1759–1815), British lieutenant-general
- John Stuart (British Army officer, born 1811) (1811–1889), British general

== Religion ==
- John Stuart (priest) (c.1740–1811), Anglican clergyman in Canada
- John Stuart (Presbyterian minister) (1743–1821), Scottish minister and Bible translator
- John Stuart (Edinburgh minister) (1819–1888), Scottish minister and Chaplain in Ordinary to Queen Victoria
- John Leighton Stuart (1876–1962), American missionary educator

== Others ==
- John Ferdinand Smyth Stuart (1745–1814), Scottish physician
- John Stuart of Inchbreck (1751–1827), Scottish professor of Greek
- John Stuart (abolitionist) (Ottobah Cugoano, c. 1757 – after 1791), African abolitionist
- John Stuart (explorer) (1780–1847), Canadian explorer
- John Stuart (antiquarian) (1813–1877), Scottish antiquarian and genealogist
- John McDouall Stuart (1815–1866), Scottish explorer
- John Stuart (CEO) (1877–1969), American businessman
- Johnny Stuart (1901–1970), American baseball player
- John Stuart Jr. (1912–1997), American businessman
- John Stuart (weightlifter) (born 1920), Canadian weightlifter
- John Trevor Stuart (born 1929), British mathematician

== Other uses ==
- Lord John Stuart and His Brother, Lord Bernard Stuart, a portrait of Lord John Stewart by Anthony van Dyck

== See also ==
- John Stewart (disambiguation)
- Jon Stewart (disambiguation)
- John Stuart Mill (1806–1873), English philosopher
