= Robert Stuart (businessman) =

United States businessman, a founder of the Quaker Oats Company

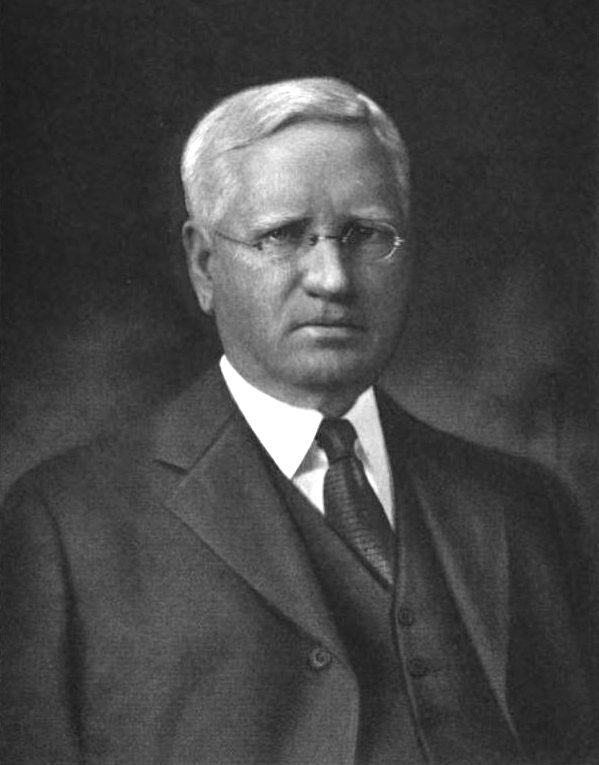
- Born: November 22, 1852; Ingersoll, Canada West
- Died: January 27, 1926 (aged 73); Pinehurst, North Carolina, U.S.
- Resting place: Rosehill Cemetery
- Occupation: Businessman
- Spouse: Margaret Shearer
- Children: John Stuart; R. Douglas Stuart
- Parent: John Stuart
- Relatives: John Stuart Jr. (grandson)

Robert Stuart (November 22, 1852 - January 27, 1926) was an American businessman who was one of the founders of the Quaker Oats Company.

== Early life ==
Robert Stuart was born in Ingersoll, Canada West on November 22, 1852, the son of John Stuart. His father had opened a mill in Embro, Canada West in the mid-1850s. In 1873, they moved to Cedar Rapids, Iowa, opening an oatmeal mill there, the North Star Oatmeal Mills. It was considered to be the world's largest at the time. The father and son team later opened a second mill in Chicago, and gained market share in the Midwest, especially in Chicago, Milwaukee, and Detroit.

== Career ==
Stuart went into partnership with a railroader, George Bruce Douglas Sr., in 1874.

In 1885, the Stuarts entered into a business partnership with competitor Henry Parsons Crowell, proprietor of the Quaker Mill Company in Ravenna, Ohio in an attempt to compete against the much larger oatmeal business run by Ferdinand Schumacher, the "Oatmeal King". The next year, Schumacher's largest mill burned down, leaving the uninsured Schumacher in difficult financial circumstances. Thus, he asked to join their business, thus forming the Consolidated Oatmeal Company, with Crowell as president, Stuart as vice-president, and Schumacher as treasurer. The Consolidated Oatmeal Company collapsed in 1888.

Later in 1888, Schumacher led the way in organizing a consolidation of seven mills as the American Cereal Company, with Schumacher as president, Crowell as vice-president, and Stuart as treasurer. This company survived the wake of the Panic of 1893 by consolidating its facilities into two mills, one at Cedar Rapids, Iowa and the other at Akron, Ohio. In 1897, Schumacher and Stuart disagreed about investing money in the Cedar Rapids mill, and Schumacher eventually forced Stuart to resign from the American Cereal Company. The next year, Schumacher also forced Crowell out of the American Cereal Company.

Stuart and Crowell, who together owned 24% of the American Cereal Company, now organized a proxy fight and in 1899 managed to oust Schumacher from the company. Stuart and Crowell then undertook a massive expansion of the business, with Stuart managing the company's facilities and Crowell handling promotions. In 1901, the American Cereal Company was renamed the Quaker Oats Company. At that time, the Quaker Oats Company was doing $16 million of sales annually, selling wheat cereals, farina, hominy, cornmeal, baby food, and animal feed. By 1918, the company did $123 million in sales.

== Personal life, death and legacy ==
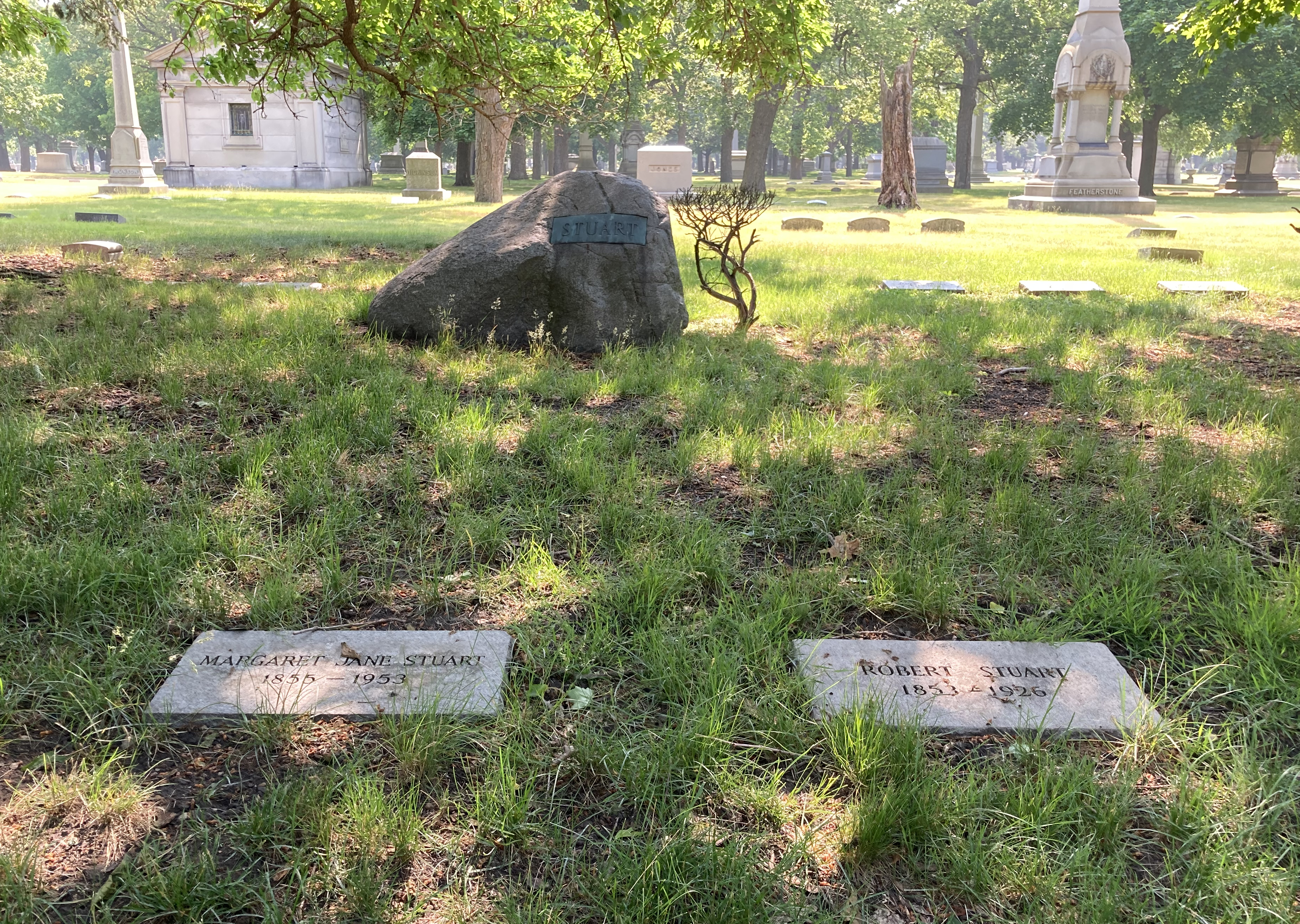
Stuart's grave at Rosehill Cemetery

Stuart married Margaret Shearer. They resided in Chicago and Pinehurst, North Carolina, where he died of heart disease on January 27, 1926. He was buried at Rosehill Cemetery.

Stuart's son, John, became chief executive officer of the Quaker Oats Company in 1922. A second son, R. Douglas Stuart would take over Crowell's marketing duties a short time later.
