= R. Douglas Stuart =

American diplomat

Robert Douglas Stuart (January 20, 1886 – January 5, 1975) was a United States businessman who served as United States Ambassador to Canada from 1953 to 1956.

== Early life ==
Stuart was born in Chicago in 1886, the son of Robert Stuart and his wife, Margaret Shearer. In 1899, Stuart's father and his business partner, Henry Parsons Crowell, used a proxy fight to gain control of the American Cereal Company from Ferdinand Schumacher. In 1901, they renamed the company the Quaker Oats Company to take advantage of the brand that had been built up by Crowell's Quaker Mill Company. Stuart's father was thus one of the co-founders of the Quaker Oats Company.

== Business ==
From 1901 to 1921, Robert Stuart had been responsible for managing the Quaker Oats Company's facilities, and Crowell had been responsible for marketing. Douglas Stuart's older brother, John Stuart, was groomed to take over Robert Stuart's responsibilities, while Douglas Stuart trained under Crowell. In 1922, the elder Stuart and Crowell retired, and John and Douglas Stuart took over the day-to-day operations of the company.

== Politics ==
Stuart was active in the Republican Party. His son, R. Douglas Stuart Jr., was the founder of the America First Committee, which opposed United States participation in World War II, in September 1940.

== Postwar ==
After World War II, Stuart took Quaker Oats' marketing in a bold new direction, with Quaker Oats becoming one of the first companies to employ the services of more than one advertising agency.

Besides Quaker Oats, Stuart was active in the community. He was a delegate to the 1952 Republican National Convention. Stuart was also long-time president of the Chicago Council of the Boy Scouts of America. One of the original subcamps at the Owasippe Scout Reservation, America's first and oldest Scout camp, owned by the Council is named in his honor.

== Ambassador ==
In 1953, President of the United States Dwight Eisenhower named Stuart United States Ambassador to Canada. Stuart presented his credentials to Vincent Massey, Governor General of Canada, on July 15, 1953. He served in Ottawa until May 4, 1956.

== Later life ==
After serving as ambassador, Stuart returned to Quaker Oats. He retired as chairman of the board in 1962.

In addition to his son, Stuart and his wife had three daughters, one, Anne, who would go on to marry Nebraska politician Clifton Batchelder.

Stuart died at his home in Lake Forest, Illinois on January 5, 1975.

Diplomatic posts
| Preceded by Stanley Woodward | United States Ambassador to Canada; July 15, 1953 – May 4, 1956 | Succeeded by Livingston T. Merchant |
