= Douglas Stuart =

Douglas Stuart may refer to:

- Douglas Stuart (rower) (1885–1969), British rower
- R. Douglas Stuart (1886–1975), United States Ambassador to Canada (1953–1956)
- R. Douglas Stuart Jr. (1916–2014), founder of the America First Committee, CEO of Quaker Oats, and United States Ambassador to Norway (1984–1989)
- Douglas Stuart, 20th Earl of Moray (1928–2011), British peer
- Douglas G. Stuart (1931–2019), professor of physiology at the University of Arizona
- Douglas Stuart (biblical scholar) (born 1943), professor of the Old Testament at Gordon-Conwell Theological Seminary
- Douglas Stuart (writer) (born 1976), Scottish-American writer

== See also ==
- Douglas Stewart (disambiguation)
