= 1974 Nebraska gubernatorial election =

- November 5, 1974
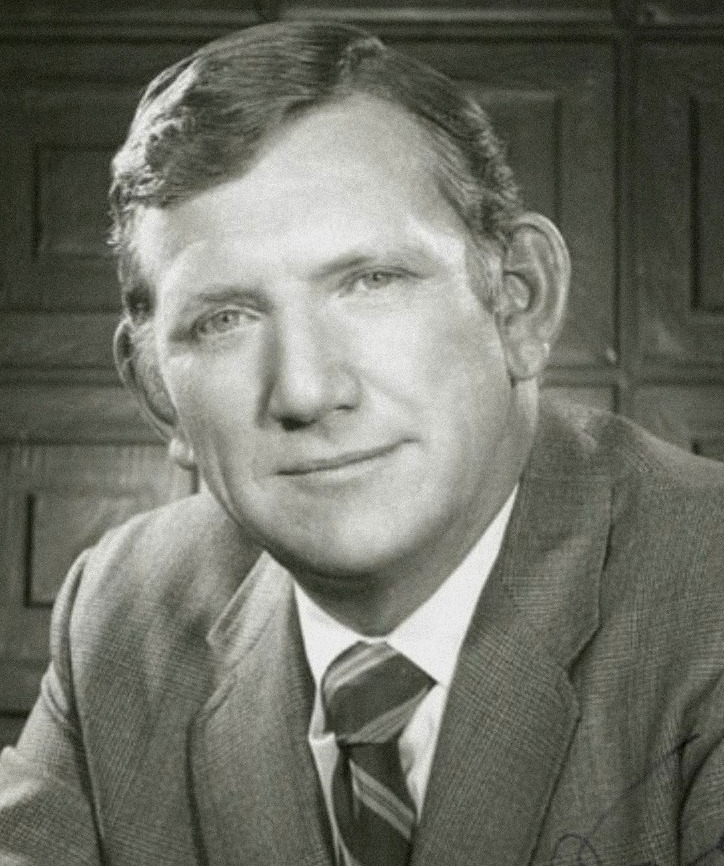

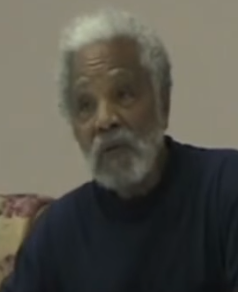
Nominee	J. James Exon	Richard D. Marvel	Ernie Chambers (Write-in)
Party	Democratic	Republican	Independent
Running mate	Gerald Whelan	Anne S. Batchelder
Popular vote	267,012	159,780	24,320
Percentage	59.16%	35.40%	5.39%
- County results Exon: 40–50% 50–60% 60–70% 70–80% Marvel: 40–50% 50–60%
Governor before election
J. James Exon
Democratic
Elected Governor
J. James Exon
Democratic

The 1974 Nebraska gubernatorial election was held on November 5, 1974, and featured incumbent Governor J. James Exon, a Democrat, defeating Republican nominee, state Senator Richard D. Marvel. Independent state senator Ernie Chambers also captured 5% of the vote as a write-in candidate. This was the first gubernatorial election in Nebraska in which the nominees for governor and lieutenant governor ran as a single ticket in the general election, though they were chosen in separate primary elections.

== Democratic primary ==
=== Governor ===
==== Candidates ====
- J. James Exon, incumbent governor
- Richard D. Schmitz

==== Results ====
Democratic gubernatorial primary results
Party	Candidate	Votes	%
Democratic	J. James Exon (incumbent)	125,690	87.40
Democratic	Richard D. Schmitz	17,889	12.44
Democratic	Write-in	232	0.16

=== Lieutenant governor ===
==== Candidates ====
- Julius W. Burbach, member of the Nebraska Legislature in District 19 since 1957 and unsuccessful candidate for the Democratic nomination for Nebraska governor in 1966 and 1970
- Terry Carpenter, member of the Nebraska Legislature in District 48 since 1963 and previously from 1953 to 1955 and 1957 to 1961, former United States representative from 1933 to 1935, and unsuccessful candidate for governor, lieutenant governor, and United States senate several times.
- James LaHood
- Frank Lewis
- Gerald Whelan, lawyer and unsuccessful Democratic nominee for Nebraska's 1st congressional district in 1960 (endorsed by J. James Exon)

==== Results ====
Democratic lieutenant gubernatorial primary results
Party	Candidate	Votes	%
Democratic	Gerald Whelan	77,233	54.11
Democratic	Terry Carpenter	34,279	24.02
Democratic	Julius W. Burbach	20,910	14.65
Democratic	Frank Lewis	8,352	5.85
Democratic	James LaHood	1,903	1.33
Democratic	Write-in	45	0.03

== Republican primary ==
=== Governor ===
==== Candidates ====
- Richard D. Marvel, member of the Nebraska Legislature

==== Results ====
Republican gubernatorial primary results
Party	Candidate	Votes	%
Republican	Richard D. Marvel	139,783	99.49
Republican	Write-in	720	0.51

=== Lieutenant governor ===
==== Candidates ====
- Anne S. Batchelder, businesswoman, wife of Clifton B. Batchelder, and daughter of R. Douglas Stuart
- William M. Wylie, farmer, businessman, and former member of the Nebraska Legislature in District 20 and District 40 from 1965 to 1971

==== Results ====
Republican lieutenant gubernatorial primary results
Party	Candidate	Votes	%
Republican	Anne S. Batchelder	90,058	59.12
Republican	William M. Wylie	61,952	40.67
Republican	Write-in	326	0.21

== General election ==
=== Results ===
Nebraska gubernatorial election, 1974
Party	Candidate	Votes	%
Democratic	J. James Exon (incumbent)	267,012	59.16%
Republican	Richard D. Marvel	159,780	35.40%
Write-in	Ernie Chambers	24,320	5.39%
Write-in	Others	194	0.04%
Total votes		451,306	100.0%
Democratic hold			

==== By county ====
By county

County	Person Democratic		Person Republican		Various candidates Other parties		Margin		Total votes
County	#	%	#	%	#	%	#	%	Total votes
Adams County									
Antelope County									
Arthur County									
Banner County									
Blaine County									
Boone County									
Box Butte County									
Boyd County									
Brown County									
Buffalo County									
Burt County									
Butler County									
Cass County									
Cedar County									
Chase County									
Cherry County									
Cheyenne County									
Clay County									
Colfax County									
Cuming County									
Custer County									
Dakota County									
Dawes County									
Dawson County									
Deuel County									
Dixon County									
Dodge County									
Douglas County									
Dundy County									
Fillmore County									
Franklin County									
Frontier County									
Furnas County									
Gage County									
Garden County									
Garfield County									
Gosper County									
Grant County									
Greeley County									
Hall County									
Hamilton County									
Hayes County									
Hitchcock County									
Holt County									
Hooker County									
Howard County									
Jefferson County									
Johnson County									
Kearney County									
Keith County									
Keya Paha County									
Kimball County									
Knox County									
Lancaster County									
Lincoln County									
Logan County									
Loup County									
Madison County									
McPherson County									
Merrick County									
Morrill County									
Nance County									
Nance County									
Nemaha County									
Nuckolls County									
Otoe County									
Pawnee County									
Perkins County									
Phelps County									
Pierce County									
Platte County									
Polk County									
Red Willow County									
Richardson County									
Rock County									
Saline County									
Sarpy County									
Saunders County									
Scotts Bluff County									
Seward County									
Sheridan County									
Sioux County									
Stanton County									
Thayer County									
Stanton County									
Thurston County									
Valley County									
Washington County									
Wayne County									
Webster County									
Wheeler County									
York County									
Totals									
