= Robert D. Stuart Jr. =

American lawyer, businessman, activist, and diplomat (1916–2014)

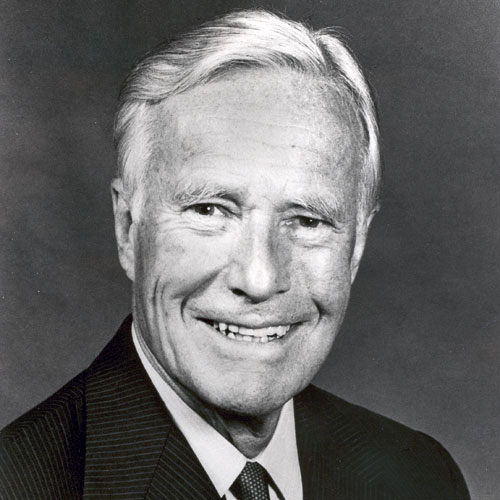

United States Ambassador to Norway
- In office September 18, 1984 – July 17, 1989
- President: Ronald Reagan
- Preceded by: Mark Evans Austad
- Succeeded by: Loret Miller Ruppe

Personal details
- Born: April 26, 1916 Winnetka, Illinois, U.S.
- Died: May 8, 2014 (aged 98)
- Party: Republican
- Spouse(s): Barbara Edwards (d. 1993); Ingegjerd Løvenskiold (m. 1995)
- Children: 4
- Education: Princeton University (AB); Yale University (LLB)

Military service
- Allegiance: United States
- Branch/service: United States Army
- Rank: Major
- Battles/wars: World War II

Robert Douglas Stuart Jr. (April 26, 1916 – May 8, 2014) was the son of Quaker Oats Company co-founder R. Douglas Stuart, founded the America First Committee in 1940, was CEO of Quaker Oats from 1966 to 1981, and United States Ambassador to Norway from 1984 to 1989.

== Early life ==
Stuart was born in Winnetka, Illinois, on April 26, 1916, the son of Harriet (McClure) and R. Douglas Stuart. His grandfather, Robert Stuart was one of the founders of the Quaker Oats Company. He was educated at Princeton University, graduating with a A.B. in 1937. He then attended Yale Law School.

== America First ==
On September 4, 1940, while a law student, Stuart organized the anti-interventionist organization America First Committee to support the enforcement of the Neutrality Acts of the 1930s and to oppose United States intervention in World War II. Other students who joined Stuart's committee included Gerald Ford, Sargent Shriver, and Potter Stewart. The America First Committee asked Robert E. Wood, chairman of Sears, Roebuck and Company, to become its leader. They later asked Charles Lindbergh to serve as their spokesman.

At its height, the America First Committee may have had as many as 800,000 members in 650 chapters. It was disbanded shortly after the attack on Pearl Harbor by the Empire of Japan, on December 7, 1941.

== Army service ==
Stuart served in the US Army during World War II, attaining the rank of major. After the war, he returned to Yale Law School and received his J.D. in 1946.

== Career ==
Stuart joined the Quaker Oats Company, where he worked for 38 years. He was chief executive officer of the company from 1966 to 1981, first as president and later as chairman of the board. While CEO, Stuart diversified the company, especially in 1969 when Quaker Oats acquired toy manufacturer Fisher-Price. During his time as CEO, revenues grew from $500 million to $2 billion.

In addition to running Quaker Oats, Stuart sat on the boards of directors of the First National Bank of Chicago, United Airlines, Deere & Company, and Molson.

Stuart was active in the Republican Party. From 1964 to 1972, he was the Illinois Republican Party member on the Republican National Committee.

He was also active in the Boy Scouts of America and the Chicago Urban League.

In 1984, President Ronald Reagan named Stuart as United States Ambassador to Norway. Stuart presented his credentials on October 16, 1984, and served as ambassador until July 17, 1989.

Stuart was a member of the Base Realignment and Closure Commission in 1991 and 1993. He was appointed to the 1991 commission by President George H. W. Bush and the 1993 commission by President Bill Clinton.

He served on the board of the National Commission on the Public Service, which was chaired by Paul Volcker, which produced the Volcker Report in 2003.

== Death ==
Stuart died of a heart attack while he was traveling back to the United States from France, at the age of 98, on May 8, 2014.

== Personal life ==
Stuart was first married in 1938 to Barbara Edwards. The couple had five children. Barbara accompanied him during his ambassadorship in Norway, where they developed close ties and friendships. She died in 1993. In 1995, Stuart married Ingegjerd ''Lillan'' Løvenskiold, a Norwegian widow, and Mistress of the Robes to Queen Sonja of Norway, he had met during his diplomatic service. Through this marriage, he gained a large extended family in Norway, including step-children, grandchildren, and great-grandchildren, whom he adored.

He divided his later years between the family ranch in Wyoming and his wife’s home in Norway. Stuart died on May 8, 2014, at the age of 98 from heart failure, en route from France to the United States with Lillan.

Stuart was a recipient of the Grand Cross of the Order of St. Olav.

Diplomatic posts
Preceded by Mark Evans Austad	United States Ambassador to Norway; October 16, 1984 – July 17, 1989	Succeeded by Loret Miller Ruppe
