= Sir John Stewart, 1st Baronet =

Sir John Stewart, 1st Baronet may refer to:

- Sir John Stewart, 1st Baronet, of Athenree (c.1758–1825), Member of Parliament (MP) for Tyrone 1802–1806 and 1812–1825
- Sir John Stewart, 1st Baronet, of Fingask (1877–1924), Scottish whisky distiller

== See also ==
- John Stewart (disambiguation)
