= John Stewart =

John Stewart may refer to:

== Business ==
- John Aikman Stewart (1822–1926), American banker
- John Killough Stewart (1867–1938), businessman and philanthropist in Queensland, Australia
- John K. Stewart (1870–1916), American entrepreneur and inventor
- John Leighton Stewart (1876–1940), American newspaper publisher
- Sir John Stewart, 1st Baronet, of Fingask (1877–1924), Scottish whisky distiller
- John Stewart (businessman) (born 1949), British businessman

== Entertainment ==
- Johnnie Stewart (1917–2005), British radio and TV producer, creator of Top of the Pops
- John Stewart (musician) (1939–2008), American singer-songwriter, member of The Kingston Trio
- John Stewart (tenor) (born 1940), American opera singer
- John Clarence Stewart (born 1988), American actor and singer

== Military ==
- John Stewart (constable of Stirling Castle) (fl. 1576–1581), Scottish soldier
- Lord John Stewart (1621–1644), Scottish aristocrat who served as a Royalist commander in the English Civil War
- John Stewart (of Livingstone) (died 1726), Scottish army officer and MP for Kirkcudbright Stewartry, 1708–15
- John Roy Stewart (1700–1752), officer in the Jacobite army of 1745 and poet
- John Stewart (British Army officer, died 1796) (1709–1796), Scottish officer in the Dutch Army and MP for Anstruther Burghs
- J. D. H. Stewart (John Donald Hamill Stewart, 1845–1884), British Army officer, aide to General Gordon at Khartoum
- John Stewart of Ardvorlich (1904–1985), British Army officer and historian

== Politics and government ==
=== Australia ===
- John Stewart (New South Wales colonial politician) (1810–1896), New South Wales colonial MLA
- John Stewart (Western Australian politician) (1868–1927), MLA in Western Australia
- John Stewart (New South Wales Labor politician) (1876–1957), New South Wales state MLC

=== Canada ===
- John Stewart (Prince Edward Island politician) (c. 1758–1834), Scottish-born army officer and politician
- John Duncan Stewart (1839–1921), farmer and political figure in Saskatchewan
- John Alexander Stewart (politician) (1867–1922), Canadian Member of Parliament from Ontario
- John Smith Stewart (1878–1970), Canadian Member of Parliament from Alberta
- John Benjamin Stewart (1924–2015), Canadian Member of Parliament from Nova Scotia
- John Stewart (Toronto politician), Reform Party of Canada candidate in the 1997 Canadian federal election

=== New Zealand ===
- John Stewart (New Zealand politician) (1902–1973)

=== United Kingdom ===
- John Stewart (Wigtownshire MP, died 1748), MP for Scotland in the first Parliament of Great Britain and later for Wigtownshire
- John Stewart (Wigtownshire MP, died 1769), of Castle Stewart, Scottish Member of Parliament for Wigtownshire
- John Stewart (Arundel MP) (1720s–1781), British Member of Parliament for Arundel
- John Stewart (Camelford MP) (1755–1826), West India planter and MP for Camelford
- Sir John Stewart, 1st Baronet, of Athenree (1758–1825), MP for Tyrone 1802–1806 and 1812–1825
- John Stewart (Beverley MP) (1784–1873), British Member of Parliament for Beverley
- John Stewart (Lymington MP) (1789–1860), British Member of Parliament for Lymington
- John Stewart (Glasgow politician) (1867–1947), Lord Provost of Glasgow
- John D. Stewart (writer) (1917–1988), Northern Irish author, activist, and playwright
- John Stewart (diplomat) (1927–1995), British geologist, colonial administrator, first British ambassador to unified Vietnam
- Allan Stewart (politician) (John Allan Stewart, 1942–2016), Scottish Member of Parliament
- John Stewart (Northern Ireland politician) (born 1983), unionist politician

=== United States ===
- John Stewart (Pennsylvania politician) (died 1809), U.S. representative from Pennsylvania
- John Stewart (Connecticut politician) (1795–1860), U.S. representative from Connecticut
- John Stewart (Illinois politician) (1825–1915), member of the Illinois House of Representatives
- John Wesley Stewart (1822–1899), American politician in Wisconsin and Illinois
- John Wolcott Stewart (1825–1915), U.S. senator from Vermont
- John D. Stewart (politician) (1833–1894), U.S. representative from Georgia
- John Knox Stewart (1853–1919), U.S. representative from New York
- J. George Stewart (1890–1970), U.S. representative from Delaware and Architect of the Capitol
- John C. Stewart (born 1949), member of the Michigan House of Representatives

== Royalty and aristocracy ==
- Sir John Stewart (knight, died 1298), son of Alexander, 4th High Steward of Scotland
- John Stewart, 1st Earl of Angus (died 1331), Scottish nobleman
- Robert III of Scotland (c. 1337–1406), who before he became king was known as John Stewart, Earl of Carrick
- Sir John Stewart of Darnley (c. 1380–1429), Scottish nobleman, Lord of Concressault, Aubigny, Count of Évreux
- John Stewart, Earl of Buchan (1381–1424), Constable of France
- John Stewart of Ralston (fl. 1436), Scottish nobleman, half-brother of King Robert II
- John Stewart, 3rd Lord of Aubigny (died 1482), Scottish and French nobleman, son of Sir John Stewart of Darnley
- John Stewart, 1st Earl of Lennox, (c. 1430–1495), Scottish nobleman
- John Stewart, 1st Earl of Atholl (c. 1440–1512), Scottish nobleman and ambassador to England, 1484
- John Stewart, Earl of Mar (died 1479) (c. 1456–c. 1479), youngest son of King James II of Scotland
- John Stewart, 2nd Earl of Atholl (c. 1475–c.1522), Scottish nobleman, son of the 1st Earl of Atholl
- John Stewart, Earl of Mar (died 1503) (c. 1479–1503), youngest son of King James III of Scotland, nephew of the Earl of Mar (died 1479)
- John Stewart, Duke of Albany (1481/1484–1536), regent of the Kingdom of Scotland, nephew of the Earl of Mar (died 1479)
- John Stewart, 3rd Earl of Lennox (c. 1490–1526), Scottish magnate, grandson of the 1st Earl of Lennox
- John Stewart, 3rd Earl of Buchan (c. 1498–c. 1551), Scottish nobleman
- John Stewart, 3rd Earl of Atholl (1507–1542), Scottish nobleman, son of the 2nd Earl of Atholl
- Sir John Stewart of Minto (1525–1583), provost of Glasgow
- John Stewart, Commendator of Coldingham (1531–1563), illegitimate son of King James V of Scotland
- John Stewart, 4th Earl of Atholl (died 1579), Scottish nobleman, son of the 3rd Earl of Atholl
- John Stewart, 5th Earl of Atholl (1563–1595), Scottish nobleman, son of the 4th Earl of Atholl
- John Stewart of Traquair (died 1591), Scottish landowner
- John Stewart, 1st Earl of Atholl (1566–1603), Scottish landowner
- Sir John Stewart of Methven (died 1628), governor of Dumbarton Castle and admiral of the Western Seas
- John Stewart, 1st Earl of Traquair (died 1659), Scottish statesman
- John Stewart, Earl of Carrick (died c. 1645), Scottish nobleman, third son of Robert, Earl of Orkney
- John Stewart, 7th Earl of Galloway (1736–1806), Scottish peer
- John Stewart-Murray, 7th Duke of Atholl (1840–1917), Scottish peer
- John Stewart-Murray, 8th Duke of Atholl (1871–1942), Scottish soldier and Conservative politician

== Science ==
- John Vandeleur Stewart (1804–1872), Irish naturalist, ornithologist
- John Stewart of Nateby Hall (1813–1867), Scottish naturalist
- John Tiffin Stewart (1827–1913), New Zealand civil engineer and surveyor
- John Lindsay Stewart (1831–1873), Scottish botanist
- John Quincy Stewart (1894–1972), American astrophysicist

== Sports ==
=== Football and rugby ===
- John P. Stewart (fl. 1903–1906), American football coach
- Johnny Stewart (footballer, born 1872), English footballer
- John W. Stewart (American football) (1889–1943), American football, basketball, and track coach, college athletics administrator
- John Stewart (footballer, born 1914) (1914–?), Scottish footballer
- JJ Stewart (John Joseph Stewart, 1923–2002), New Zealand rugby union coach
- John Stewart (footballer, born 1937), English footballer
- John Stewart (footballer, born 1985), Scottish footballer
- John Stewart (rugby union, born 1988), Fijian rugby union player
- John Stewart (rugby union, born 2002), English rugby union player

=== Other sports ===
- John Stewart (cricketer) (fl. 1792–1797), English cricketer
- Stuffy Stewart (John Franklin Stewart, 1894–1980), American baseball player
- John Stewart (ice hockey, born 1950), Canadian ice hockey player
- John Stewart (ice hockey, born 1954), Canadian ice hockey player

== Other people ==
- John Stewart of Baldynneis (c. 1545–c. 1605), Scottish courtier and writer
- John Stewart (minister) (1743–1821), Scottish minister and Gaelic scholar
- Walking Stewart (John Stewart, 1747–1822), English traveller and philosopher
- John Stewart (missionary) (1786–1823), American Methodist missionary to the Wyandot Indians
- John Shaw Stewart (1793–1840), Scottish advocate and essayist
- John Alexander Stewart (philosopher) (1846–1933), Scottish writer, educator and philosopher
- John McKellar Stewart (1878–1953), professor of philosophy at the University of Adelaide
- John Alexander Stewart (scholar) (1882–1948), Scottish scholar of Burmese
- J. I. M. Stewart (John Innes Mackintosh Stewart, 1906–1994), Scottish novelist and critic
- John Durie Stewart (fl. 1963), assistant international commissioner of the Scout Association
- John Stewart (bishop) (born 1940), Australian Anglican bishop
- John Stewart (campaigner) (born 1950), British environmental campaigner

== Fictional characters ==
- John Stewart (character), superhero member of the Green Lantern Corps in the DC Universe

== See also ==
- Jack Stewart (disambiguation)
- Jackie Stewart (disambiguation)
- John Stuart (disambiguation)
- Jon Stewart (disambiguation)
