= Douglas Stewart =

Douglas Stewart may refer to:

- Douglas Stewart (poet) (1913–1985), Australian poet
- Edward Askew Sothern (1826–1881), English actor who was sometimes known as Douglas Stewart
- Douglas Stewart (equestrian) (1913–1991), British Olympic equestrian
- Douglas Stewart (film editor) (1919–1995), American film and television editor
- Douglas Day Stewart, American screenwriter
- Doug Stewart (game designer)
- Doug Stewart (radio broadcaster)
- Doug (Lawrence Douglas) Stewart, Australian race and rally driver and founder of Ralliart
- Douglass Stewart, American playwright

== See also ==
- Douglas Stuart (disambiguation)
