= Jackie Stewart (disambiguation) =

Sir Jackie Stewart (born 1939) is a British racing driver.

Jackie Stewart may also refer to:

- Jackie Stewart (footballer, born 1921) (1921–1990), Raith Rovers and Birmingham City player
- Jackie Stewart (footballer, born 1929) (1929–2004), Dunfermline Athletic, East Fife and Walsall player
- Jackie Stewart (football manager) (fl. 1950s–1978), Scottish football player and manager

== See also ==
- Jack Stewart (disambiguation)
- John Stewart (disambiguation)
- Jackson Stewart (disambiguation)
