= Jon Stewart (disambiguation) =

Jon Stewart (born 1962) is an American political satirist, writer, television host and stand-up comedian.

Jon, Jonny or Jonathan Stewart may also refer to:

- Jon Stewart (philosopher) (born 1961), American philosopher and historian of philosophy
- Jon Stewart, co-founder of the English rock band Sleeper
- Jonathan Stewart (born 1987), American football running back
- Jon Stewart (footballer) (born 1989), English footballer
- Jonathan Stewart (linebacker) (born 1990), American football linebacker
- Jonny Stewart (born 1990), Scottish footballer

== See also ==
- John Stuart (disambiguation)
- John Stewart (disambiguation)
