= Scott's Porage Oats =

Breakfast cereal brand produced in Scotland

- Formerly: Scott's Midlothian Oat Flour (1880–1914)
- Type: Private (1880–1982)
- Industry: Food
- Founded: 1880; 146 years ago
- Founder: A&R Scott Brothers
- Fate: Acquired by Quaker in 1982; Quaker merged into PepsiCo in 2001
- Headquarters: Edinburgh, Scotland
- Area served: United Kingdom
- Products: Breakfast cereals, biscuits
- Parent: Quaker Oats Company
- Website: https://contact.pepsico.com/scottsporageuk/site-map

Scott's Porage Oats is a Scottish breakfast cereal (a brand of porridge) sold in the United Kingdom. The former Scott's Company was established in Glasgow by A&R Scott, two brothers who made a partnership to manufacture oat products. Scott's was purchased by Quaker Oats in 1982.

== History of the brand ==
Porridge has been consumed in Scotland as a staple food since the Middle Ages, and is primarily consumed in the winter. A&R Scott began producing Scott's Midlothian Oat Flour in 1880, in Glasgow, moving to Edinburgh in 1909, and the distinctive name, Scott's Porage Oats, was adopted in 1914. They have been milled at the Uthrogle Mills at Cupar in Fife, Scotland, since 1947.

In 1982, A&R Scott was purchased by Quaker Oats Ltd, one of their main competitors. The company was based in Edinburgh. PepsiCo merged with the Quaker Oats Company in 2001.

Sales of porridge oats continue to be higher in Scotland than in the rest of the UK, with Scott's Porage Oats taking the highest brand share.

The company holds a Scott's Porage Oats Food & Drink Fair at the St Andrews Festival in November each year at the Byre Theatre. It has a Golden Spurtle Award for competitive porridge making.

== Description and preparation ==
The oats are rolled thicker than standard oats and are gently kilned to create what the company considers to be "the truest taste".

Scott's oats can be made into porridge either in the microwave or on a stovetop, with the addition of milk or water and other flavourings (typically salt or sugar). Oats can also be used in stews, in the topping for fruit crumble or haddock pie, and in cookies or flapjacks, and in many other recipes. Some packs come with a number of suggested recipes.

== Advertising ==
In the late 1990s to early 2000s, Scott's Porage Oats ran a successful UK advertising campaign on cinema and television featuring the actor Rory McCann in a kilt and actress Rebecca Godwin as his admirer. Rory McCann, a former lumberjack, subsequently made many public appearances and is widely seen as the "face" of Scott's Porage Oats. Rory McCann was featured in the television adverts for the porridge, whilst the image on the box was originally based on Jay Scott, a world highland games champion who lived on the island of Inchmurrin on Loch Lomond, that his family still own. After moving to a farm on the shores of the loch, he died due to complications from an accident on his tractor.

== Other British brands ==
The following additional brands come under the Quaker Oats umbrella:

- Oatso Simple
- Quaker Oats
- Scott's So Easy
