= Loret Miller Ruppe =

American diplomat (1936–1996)

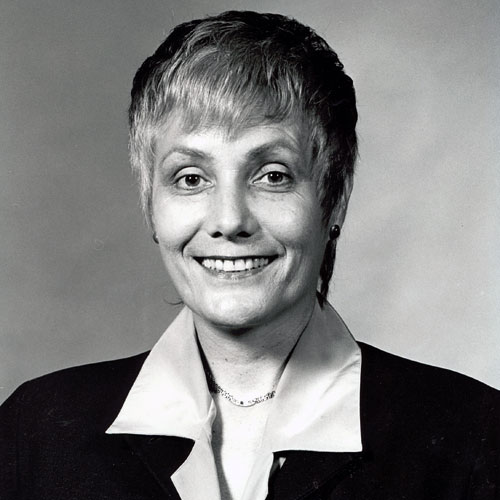

United States Ambassador to Norway
- In office August 29, 1989 – February 28, 1993
- President: George H. W. Bush
- Preceded by: Robert D. Stuart
- Succeeded by: Thomas A. Loftus

10th Peace Corps Director
- In office May 6, 1981 – April 20, 1989
- President: Ronald Reagan; George H. W. Bush
- Preceded by: Richard F. Celeste
- Succeeded by: Paul Coverdell

Personal details
- Born: January 3, 1936 Milwaukee, Wisconsin, U.S.
- Died: August 6, 1996 (aged 60) Bethesda, Maryland, U.S.
- Resting place: St. Gabriel Cemetery, Potomac, Maryland, U.S.
- Spouse: Philip Ruppe (m. 1957)
- Children: 5
- Education: Marymount College; Marquette University

Audrey Loret Miller Ruppe (January 3, 1936 – August 6, 1996) was a Director of the Peace Corps and U.S. Ambassador to Norway. She was the wife of United States House of Representatives member Philip Ruppe of Michigan.

== Early life ==
Loret Miller was born January 3, 1936, in Milwaukee, Wisconsin. Her great-grandfather, Frederick Miller, founded the Miller Brewing Company. Her father, Frederick C. Miller, was the company chairman. Her father was killed in a plane crash with his oldest son, her brother, in 1954. Ruppe attended Marymount College in Tarrytown, New York, and Marquette University in Milwaukee.

Loret Miller married Philip Ruppe in 1957 and settled in Houghton, Michigan, where she began her long career as a volunteer organizer and civic leader. Ruppe served as chairperson of the Houghton United Fund campaign, president of the St. Joseph's Hospital Guild, and as an active member of the Houghton County Republican Committee. Ruppe also traveled extensively through Africa, spending time in Kenya, Morocco, Egypt, and the Spanish Sahara where she saw the potential for partnerships with third world countries to meet human needs. Ruppe attended the Conference on Africa in Ditchley Park, England, in 1978 which furthered her interest in solving problems in the third world.

In 1966, Loret Miller's husband was the Republican candidate for the United States House of Representatives from Michigan's 11th congressional district who defeated incumbent Democratic Party member Raymond F. Clevenger to be elected to the 90th United States Congress and was subsequently re-elected to the next five Congresses, serving from January 3, 1967, to January 3, 1979. He was not a candidate for reelection in 1978 to the 96th Congress. Loret Miller was George H. W. Bush's campaign manager in the 1980 Michigan Presidential primary and was a leader of the Reagan-Bush campaign in Michigan that fall.

== Peace Corps Director ==
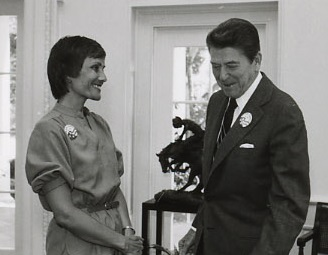
Loret Miller Ruppe and President Ronald Reagan wearing Peace Corps pins in 1981 in the Oval Office.

On February 15, 1981, President Ronald Reagan announced the selection of Ruppe as director of the Peace Corps. The White House press office said that Mrs. Ruppe "has spent most of her life in volunteer efforts," including International Neighbors Club IV, and "has traveled extensively and shared ideals with past Peace Corps volunteers in many countries." Ruppe said after her nomination "I have had a great interest in the Peace Corps and I'm very thrilled and excited about the nomination." Ruppe also stated her belief in the continuing relevance of the Peace Corps. "At a time when we're seeking a strong peace, I think this program can be a very important part of that," Ruppe said.

=== Independence of the Peace Corps ===
In 1971 the Peace Corps had lost its independent status when the Nixon Administration made it part of Action, an umbrella agency that included the Foster Grandparent Program, Volunteers in Service to America (VISTA), and the National Center for Service Learning. After the resignation of Peace Corps Director Carolyn R. Payton in 1978, President Jimmy Carter issued an executive order restoring some of its autonomy, but supporters of the agency continued to feel that under Action the Peace Corps suffered from a lack of visibility and identity. Matters came to a head in March, 1981 when Reagan appointed Tom Pauken to be director of Action. Mr. Pauken served as a military intelligence officer in the Vietnam war. The Peace Corps has a prohibition against having former intelligence agents serve in the agency. United States Senate member Alan Cranston of California led Democrats in drafting legislation to make the Peace Corps completely independent again, saying the Peace Corps could not operate with the necessary credibility and independence from the Government if it were organizationally under the direction of Mr. Pauken.

Ruppe publicly took the position that there was no need for the agency to be more independent than it already was under Action. However, on March 18, 1981, Ruppe sent a letter to Senator Alan Cranston (D-CA), which challenged Pauken's nomination. An ACTION official told The Heritage Foundation, "She fought vociferously against the Administration position that the Peace Corps should be a part of Action."

On June 20, 1981, the Peace Corps celebrated its twentieth anniversary and thousands of returned volunteers came to Howard University Washington, DC, to celebrate. At the opening of the conference, the audience of returned volunteers applauded Ruppe when she told them that she was committed to a strict policy of keeping the Peace Corps out of United States intelligence work in foreign countries. Ruppe added that on May 15, 1981, she and Secretary of State Alexander Haig had sent a joint communique to all United States embassies reaffirming that Peace Corps volunteers would not engage in spy or intelligence activities. Cranston's legislation to sever ties between Action and the Peace Corps subsequently passed even though opposed by the Reagan administration claiming the duplication of administrative overhead would cost the taxpayers an additional $3 million to $7 million per year.

=== Budget cuts ===
On November 1, 1981, the New York Times reported that Peace Corps' budget of $105 million budget would be cut to $83.6 million and that the agency had appealed to the Administration for reconsideration. Ruppe met with Secretary of State Alexander Haig about the budgetary problem and said she had found him "very supportive." "He said what we were doing was right in line with the Administration's foreign policy," Ruppe said. "But we haven't heard anything yet about our appeal," Ruppe added. Ruppe was successful in restoring the cuts. In 1996 she remembered the fight for the budget. "This agency's budget has less in purchasing power than when Sargent left it in the '60s. In 1981 it was listed in the 150 Account under 'miscellaneous.' We changed that. Its budget was less than the military marching band. We changed that. In 1983, an official State Department document listed us as the 'Peach Corps.' I said, 'I hope that doesn't mean they will cut us to the pit.'"

=== Support from Reagan ===
Ruppe was eventually able to convince Ronald Reagan, originally a skeptic of the Peace Corps, that the agency had value. "In 1983, I was invited to the White House for the state visit of Prime Minister Ratu Mara of Fiji. Everyone took their seats around this enormous table - President Reagan, Vice President Bush, Caspar Weinberger, the rest of the Cabinet, with the Prime Minister and his delegation, and myself. They talked about world conditions, sugar quotas, nuclear free zones. The President then asked the Prime Minister to make his presentation. A very distinguished gentleman, he drew himself up and said, 'President Reagan, I bring you today the sincere thanks of my government and my people.' Everyone held their breath and there was total silence. 'For the men and women of the Peace Corps who go out into our villages, who live with our people.' He went on and on. I beamed. Vice President Bush leaned over afterwards and whispered, 'What did you pay that man to say that?' A week later, the Office of Management and Budget presented the budget to President Reagan with a cut for the Peace Corps. President Reagan said, 'Don't cut the Peace Corps. It's the only thing I got thanked for last week at the State Dinner.' The Peace Corps budget went up. Vice President Bush asked kiddingly again, 'What did you pay?'"

=== Non-partisan status of the Peace Corps ===
Ruppe came under heavy pressure from within the Reagan Administration to politicize her top staff in Washington and to choose only Republican loyalists as Country Directors overseas. In 1981, Ruppe appointed ten country directors who had been selected by the Carter Administration over White House objections. In August 1982, Reagan appointed Edward A. Curran to be Peace Corps deputy director. Prior to this appointment, Curran had served as associate director of White House personnel and as the director of the National Institute of Education. At the Peace Corps, Curran attempted to carry out Reagan Administration policy but Ruppe responded by stripping him of most of his staff and official duties, including authority as acting director in her absence. "Loret's strategy is to make him so miserable that he'll quit," said one Peace Corps employee. "We took Peace Corps out of the pit of politics and made it non-partisan. It must always signify Americans pulling together for peace," said Ruppe.

=== Controversy over expansion in Central America ===
On September 24, 1984, the New York Times reported that the Peace Corps planned to double the number of volunteers serving in Honduras, Guatemala, Costa Rica and Belize to 1,200 workers over the next three years. This move was considered controversial by many returned Peace Corps volunteers who said that it politicized the Peace Corps by bolstering Reagan's fight against communism in Central America. "They have declared the Peace Corps an instrument of U.S. foreign policy and a tool of the Reagan Administration," asserted Francine Dionne, spokesman for the Returned Peace Corps Volunteers Committee on Central America. "Honduras already is running over with volunteers, and with the introduction of American troops, the place is swarming with Americans." Other returned volunteers disagreed. United States Senate member Paul Tsongas of Massachusetts. who served as a Peace Corps Volunteer in Ethiopia in the 1960s said "It's important to demonstrate to the countries that we can do more than just send arms." However Tsongas added that he "strongly objected" to ideology lectures being given to new volunteers.

=== Appeal for volunteers in Africa ===
On January 15, 1985, Ruppe issued a nationwide appeal for 600 volunteers to begin famine relief and agricultural work in Mali, Zaire, Lesotho and Niger. The Peace Corps received more than 5,000 inquiries, the largest number since the early 1960s. Ruppe announced that teams of 5 to 10 volunteers would work with small-scale farmers on land preparation, water supply, storage and preservation of crops, processing and marketing assisted by the United States Agency for International Development. This effort was known as the African Food Systems Initiative (AFSI)and the Peace Corps domestic recruitment strategy was refocused on American farmers, who responded positively to some extent. The initiative's logo was the Peace Corps dove of peace, carrying a sheaf of wheat.

=== Other accomplishments ===
While Ruppe was director, the Peace Corps began or resumed programs in seven countries: Sri Lanka, Haiti, Burundi, Guinea-Bissau, Chad, Equatorial Guinea and the Cape Verde Islands. Ruppe also started the African Food Initiative, Women In Development, and the Leadership for Peace Campaign. Ruppe launched the Competitive Enterprise Development program to promote business-oriented projects. She created business-oriented volunteer positions within the Peace Corps to promote grass roots economic growth worldwide, an agenda that was supported by Republican Party members in the United States Congress who generally disapproved of U.S. foreign aid programs.

== Ambassador to Norway ==
Ruppe was appointed Ambassador of the United States to Norway on August 7, 1989, by President George H. W. Bush and presented her credentials on August 29, 1989. She served as Ambassador until February 28, 1993.

== Personal life ==
A resident of Bethesda, Maryland, Ruppe died of ovarian cancer on August 6, 1996. Ruppe was survived by her husband, five daughters, five sisters and a brother. Inspired by her mother, Miller Ruppe's daughter, Dr. Loret Miller Ruppe, served as a Peace Corps volunteer in Nepal from 1985 to 1987 and later organized conferences aimed at encouraging under-represented minorities and women to enter engineering.

== Honors and awards ==
On September 5, 1996, United States Senate member of Connecticut Chris Dodd who served as a Peace Corps Volunteer in the Dominican Republic, honored Ruppe with a speech on the floor of the Senate: "When President Reagan appointed her in 1981, the Peace Corps budget was rapidly declining and was less than that of the military marching bands. By the end of Mrs. Ruppe's tenure she had succeeded in increasing the agency's budget almost 50 percent. In addition to budgetary challenges, Mrs. Ruppe gave the agency a political facelift by projecting the agency as non-partisan, despite the fact that she herself was a political appointee, and increasing its viability on both national and local levels. As she noted 'We took Peace Corps out of the pit of politics and made it non-partisan. It must always signify Americans pulling together for peace.' As a result of her efforts, Mrs. Ruppe was respected and admired by Democrats and Republicans alike. In terms of national visibility, she brought much needed congressional and executive level attention to the Peace Corps. Prior to her leadership the organization was nicknamed 'the corpse' and many believed its end was near. Under her command however, the organization was revitalized and its future secured. On a local level, she worked hard to increase young Americans' interest in participating in the program. By 1989, she had raised the number of volunteers by 20 percent."

On October 4, 1996, Michigan Technological University dedicated the new Master's International Program in Forestry to Ruppe. "The new master's program is a wonderful tribute to Loret Ruppe, and a wonderful opportunity for the Peace Corps and Michigan Tech," said John Hogan, Peace Corps associate director for international operations. In 2002 Wartburg College in Waverly, Iowa, dedicated the Loret Ruppe International Student Scholarships to honor the late Loret Miller Ruppe, former director of the Peace Corps and U.S. Ambassador to Norway, whose conviction was that "peace work needs to be everybody's work". The Mary Anne Foundation dedicated the Loret Miller Ruppe Ambassador for Peace Award "to tap into the original and creative thinking of the young, regarding the issues of conflict resolution, forgiveness and reconciliation." The National Peace Corps Association makes an annual Loret Miller Ruppe Award for Outstanding Community Service to a member group for a project that promote the Third Goal of Peace Corps.

== See also ==
- Peace Corps

== Sources ==
- United States Department of State: Ambassadors to Norway

Government offices
| Preceded by Richard F. Celeste | Director of the Peace Corps; 1981–1989 | Succeeded by Paul Coverdell |
Diplomatic posts
| Preceded by Robert D. Stuart | U.S. Ambassador to Norway; 1989–1993 | Succeeded by Thomas A. Loftus |
