= Clifton Batchelder =

American politician

Clifton B. Batchelder (1909–2001) was an American politician.

Batchelder served in the United States Army with the rank of lieutenant colonel, and was awarded a Silver Star while affiliated with the 2nd Armored Division. During his World War II military service, Batchelder met his future wife, Anne Stuart, who was working for the American Red Cross at the time. She was the daughter of R. Douglas Stuart. The Batchelders married in Germany shortly after the war and moved to Lake Forest, Illinois, then Omaha, Nebraska. Clifton Batchelder was subsequently named to the board of the Near North Side's YMCA. Batchelder's business interests included ranching and printing.

After serving his local YMCA, Batchelder was elected to the Nebraska Legislature. In April 1965, he proposed a reduction to a general appropriation bill that targeted higher education. His June 1965 motion to kill the incorporation of the Civil Rights Act of 1964 into Nebraskan employment law failed. In 1967, he opposed LB 358, regarding open housing. As legislators representing Omaha, Henry Pedersen and Batchelder voted against the 1968 integration of the Municipal University of Omaha into the University of Nebraska system as the University of Nebraska Omaha. Batchelder later helped pass a 1969 law that permitted anyone responding to a perceived threat to use any means necessary in self-defense. He was a candidate for the Republican nomination during the 1970 Nebraska gubernatorial election. Batchelder's campaign was critical of incumbent governor and fellow Republican Norbert Tiemann for increased spending and taxes during his tenure.

Following Clifton Batchelder's unsuccessful run for the governorship in 1970, Anne Stuart Batchelder was the running mate of 1974 Republican gubernatorial candidate Richard D. Marvel. She subsequently chaired the Nebraska Republican Party from 1975 to 1979. Clifton Batchelder died in 2001, and his wife died in 2009. The couple were inducted into the Omaha Business Hall of Fame in 2008. There is a foundation named after them.
