= Jack Stewart =

Jack Stewart may refer to:

- Jack Stewart (actor) (1913–1966), Scottish actor
- Jack Stewart (artist) (1926–2005), American artist
- Jack Stewart (diver), New Zealand diver
- Jack Stewart (ice hockey) (1917–1983), Canadian ice hockey player
- Jack Stewart (New South Wales politician) (1910–1972), Australian state politician
- Jack Stewart (Western Australian politician) (1912–1998), Australian state politician
- Jack Stewart (soccer) (born 1983), American soccer player
- Jack Stewart, sports writer, publicist, hotelier, founder of Camelback Inn
- Jack Stewart (Oklahoma politician)
- Jack Stewart (rugby union), Scottish international rugby union player
- Jack Stewart (author), American novelist

== See also ==
- Jackie Stewart (disambiguation)
- Jack Stewart-Clark (born 1929), British politician
- John Stewart (disambiguation)
- Jackson Stewart (disambiguation)
