= Jackson Stewart =

Jackson Stewart may refer to:

- Jackson Stewart (cyclist) (b. 1980), U.S. professional road racing cyclist
- Jackson Stewart (character), fictional character from U.S. children TV show Hannah Montana
- Jackson Stewart (film director) (born 1985), American film director

== See also ==
- Stewart Jackson (born 1965), British politician, Conservative MP
- Jack Stewart (disambiguation)
- Jackie Stewart (disambiguation)
