= Sunbolt =

Energy drink

Sunbolt was a "morning energy drink" created and marketed by Quaker Oats/Gatorade North America in the mid-1990s. It can best be described as Gatorade with caffeine. For 12 weeks in 1994, a marketing firm called Chesapeake Communications Group (CCG) helped Quaker/GNA test-market the drink in the Baltimore–Washington area. The drink was also marketed in the Philadelphia metro area.

Gatorade no longer makes Sunbolt, but there is a Filipino drink by the same name, which is produced by Pasig-based Alternative Beverages Company, Inc.

== Sources ==
- http://www.ccgpublicrelations.com/services/gatorade.htm
