= Crowell Trust =

The Henry Parsons Crowell and Susan Coleman Crowell Trust
- Formation: 1927
- Executive Director: Candace Sparks
- Website: crowelltrust.org

The Crowell Trust (full name: The Henry Parsons Crowell and Susan Coleman Crowell Trust) is a charitable foundation in the United States which states that it "is dedicated to the teaching and active extension of the doctrines of Evangelical Christianity".

== Overview ==
The foundation was established in 1927 by American businessman Henry Parsons Crowell, who was founder of the Quaker Oats Company, but not himself a Quaker. The foundation makes grants to various organizations in order to promote Evangelical Christianity.

It has funded a television program opposing evolution, which television station KNME refused to broadcast.

In 2023, the trust made grants totalling just over $5million; the trust had assets of $97 million.
