= Honey Ohs! =

Breakfast cereal made by Post

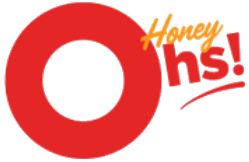

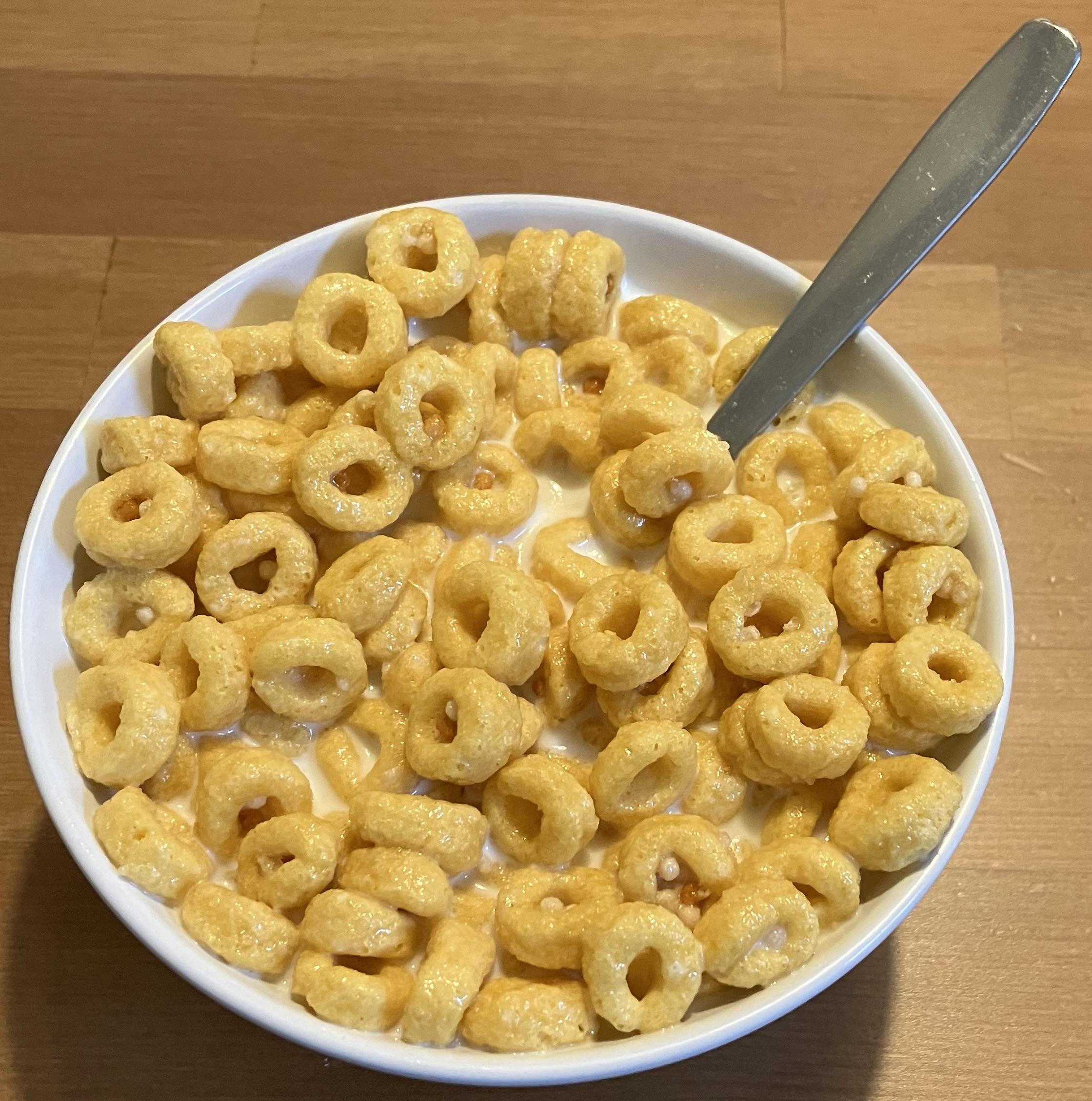
- Post Honey Oh's – Sweetened Cereal with Honey, with milk
- Product type: Breakfast cereal
- Current owner: Post Consumer Brands
- Introduced: 1980; 46 years ago
- Previous owners: Quaker Oats
- Website: postconsumerbrands.com/ohs

Honey Ohs! (previously Oh's!, Oh^{!}s, or Honey Graham Oh^{!}s) is a breakfast cereal made by Post Cereals, but originally introduced by the Quaker Oats Company.

The original Oh's! cereal was introduced in 1980 by the Quaker Oats Company and came in two varieties: Crunchy Graham and Honey Nut. In 1988, they were renamed Honey Graham and Crunchy Nut, respectively. Eventually, Crunchy Nut was discontinued and only Honey Graham was available.

In 1989, Quaker introduced a variety of flavors, including Apple Cinnamon Oh^{!}s, Apple Oh^{!}s, and Fruitangy Oh^{!}s.

In August 2014, the brand was sold to Post Foods.

In early 2018, Post reformulated the cereal as "Honey Ohs" (with no apostrophe) along with a box redesign. The new formulation no longer contains graham flour, coconut oil, brown sugar, oats, and other original ingredients.
