= Michael Gardiner (soldier) =

Scottish artilleryman (d.1584)

Michael Gardiner (died 1584) was a Scottish artilleryman based at Stirling Castle. The surname also appears as Gardner and Gardenar. He provided fireworks for royal ceremonies.

== Career ==
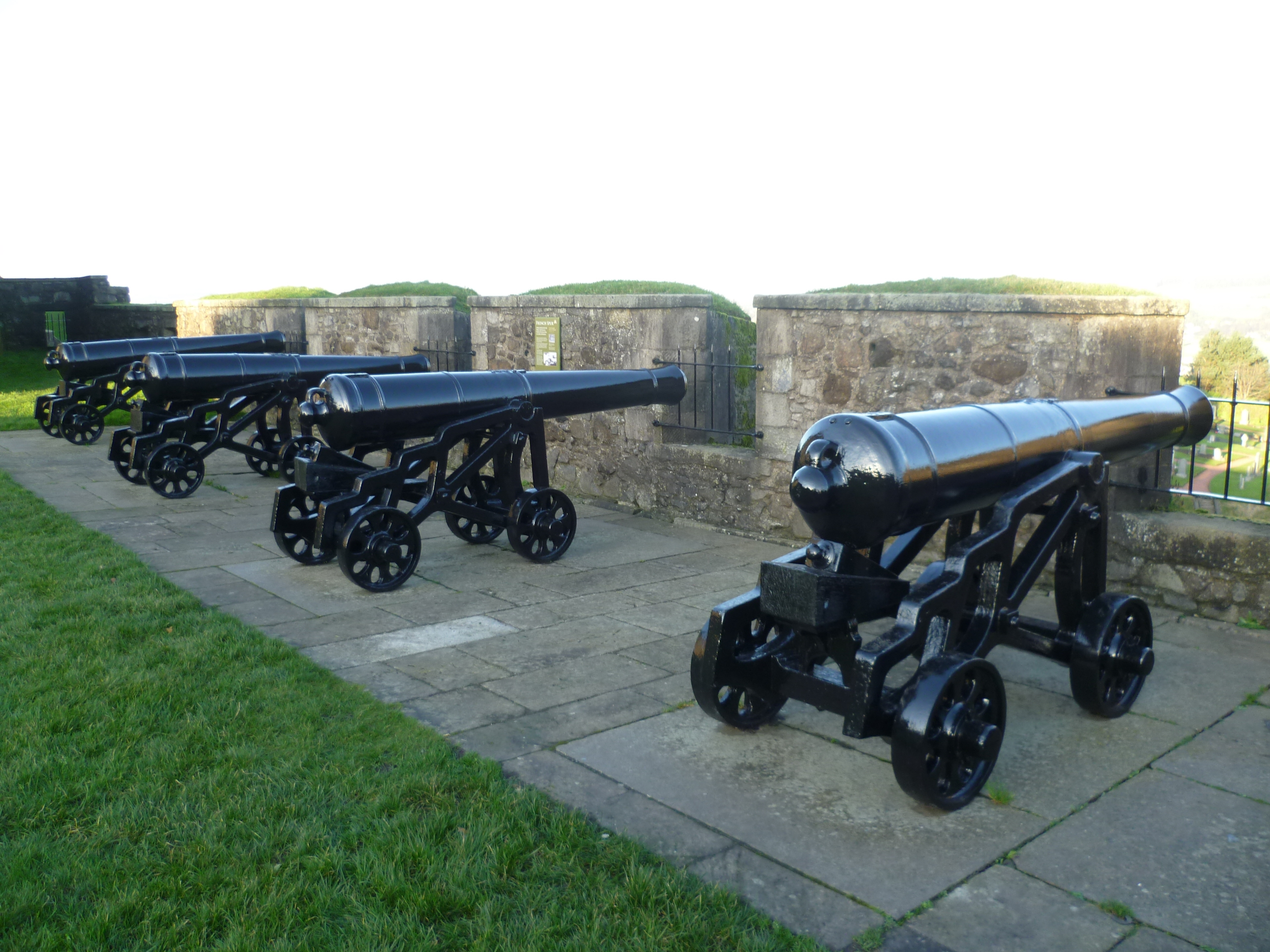
Cannon at Stirling Castle

In 1538 he was transferred from the garrison of Dunbar Castle to Stirling, and he was put on the regular pay-roll at £3 per month. In June 1541 he was sent to Kelso Abbey to collect a broken bell and three brass pots to be melted down in the gun-foundry at Edinburgh Castle. He joined a small force of artillerymen with Master Hans in the household of Mary of Guise. In August 1544 he was stationed at Dumbarton Castle. By 1555 his wage increased to £6 monthly.

Michael Gardinar was in charge of cannons at Stirling Castle as a Master Cannoner. He was also a burgess of Stirling. In 1546 his wages, the wage of the gunner Hans Cochrane, and the watchmen, porters, and "garytours" (garrison soldiers) of Stirling Castle were paid by Thomas Erskine of Haltoun from the income of Mary of Guise's lands of Brechin and Navar.

Gardinar worked with John Chisholm making fireworks for Mary, Queen of Scots for the baptism of Prince James at Stirling in December 1566. The account mentions that he was the powder maker in Edinburgh Castle, and travelled to Stirling while working on the fireworks project. Gardiner requested advice on "weak powder" from the Laird of Roslin. Another gunner, James Hector, went to Dunbar Castle and Craigmillar Castle to discuss the progress of the fireworks.

=== Marian Civil War ===
During the Marian Civil War Gardiner and his son Robert sided with Regent Lennox who was based at Leith, against the supporters of Mary, Queen of Scots and his former colleagues who garrisoned Edinburgh Castle. In May 1571 Gardiner provided ropes and other equipment to transport cannon from Stirling to Edinburgh. In October 1571 Gardiner was paid for refurbishing cannon at Stirling and transporting a "gross culverin" from Glasgow to Stirling. The guns were shipped to Leith. Robert Gardiner travelled to Perth, Dundee, and Broughty to buy iron, timber, and cannon balls, to be deployed in the Canongate. In November Gardiner's assistant David Haliburton took a boat load of "bullettis", cannon balls, from Leith to Blackness Castle. In August 1572 Michael dismantled some of the artillery and shipped it to Stirling in six boats guarded by Captain Mitchell's company, while Robert Gardiner was sent to Berwick with the Regent's letter for Lord Hunsdon.

At the end of the 'lang siege' of Edinburgh Castle, in June 1573, Gardiner dismantled the culverins used as siege cannons against the castle and took them to Holyrood Palace and then to Leith. He was paid for cables and rope, soap, tallow, axles, wedges, and other equipment.

The blacksmith and gunner at Stirling was David Smith. He died in 1578 and was replaced by John McBen. Archibald Gardinar or Gardnar, one of Michael's son, joined the garrison of Stirling Castle as a gunner in June 1578.

=== Later life ===
In 1579 the Hamilton family were suppressed for their support for Queen Mary, and for the murders of Regent Moray and Regent Lennox. The family fortified their houses and castles including Craignethan Castle and the Castle of Hamilton (Cadzow Castle). Cadzow was bombarded by Michael Gardiner, and fell on 19 May 1579. Gardiner was given £100 for his efforts, and the cost of deploying the artillery was £2,099 Scots. The castle was slighted by Captain Thomas Craufurd.

=== Death and will ===
Michael Gardiner became depute-keeper of Stirling Castle in March 1581 during the illness of the Constable, Mr John Stewart. A note from 1581 states that "Michaell kens all thing in the place, what ammunition and other gear is your Majesty's and what pertains to my Lord of Mar." An inventory of cannon of brass and iron, and some of the gunners' equipment including a crane and vices was made in April 1581.

He died on 3 May 1584. He left a will made in 1579, and his inventory mentions the king owed him £140 Scots of unpaid wages. Gardener had borrowed money from his wife's relatives in Stirling, Jonet Ray and Isobel Ray a butcher's widow. Amongst his possessions was a "locked case with instruments contained therein for my craft", brass, iron and wooden rulers, and "certain writs pertaining to his craft."

Other items mentioned in his will include his military clothing and weapons; a hat, spurs, and helmet, a whinger on a belt, a sword, a bag, a powder horn, armour (a harness), and a halberd.

=== Family and children ===
In 1584 his pension, which he had received since 1534 was transferred to his widow Margaret Ray. Some of their children were also gunners:

- Robert Gardiner, gunner at Stirling Castle from 1570, in August 1571 Regent Lennox sent him to collect a yetling cannon from Broughty Castle, he was in Flanders in 1579, and died in 1582.
- Crystal Gardiner, gunner at Stirling Castle, who died in 1582.
- Archibald Gardiner, gunner at Edinburgh Castle. In 1584 he was given a house in Stirling confiscated from Adam Erskine, Commendator of Cambuskenneth, next to the house of the Earl of Argyll and the king's embroiderer, William Beaton.
- James Gardiner, gunner at Stirling Castle, appointed in 1582 in succession to his brother Robert, and Master Cannoner 1 October 1584 in succession to his father. He brought ammunition from Stirling to Leith to salute the arrival of Anne of Denmark in 1589. James Gardiner took the cannon to Kirkwall in 1615, to besiege the Earl of Orkney.

He also had a son Christian and a daughter Helen.
