= John Stuart Jr. =

American heir of the Quaker Oats Company fortune

John Stuart Jr. (1912–1997) was one of the heirs of the Quaker Oats Company fortune.

== Biography ==
John Stuart Jr. was born in 1912, the son of John Stuart and his wife Ellen. He was educated at the Asheville School. He then attended Princeton University, graduating in 1936. While at Princeton, he was a member of the University Cottage Club.

After college, Stuart went to work for the Quaker Oats Company, mainly focusing on the company's international business in Canada and Europe. For 20 years, he lived in Peterborough, Ontario, the location of the main Quaker Oats facility in Canada. On Old Orchard Farm, his estate outside of Peterborough, he raised prize Hereford cattle.

Stuart and his first wife, Nancy (née Whiting, Chicago IL) had two children, Stephanie and John III. With his second wife, Norma (née Bobcaygeon, Ontario, Canada) he had one daughter, Joan. His third wife was named Wihla.

In retirement, Stuart lived first in Sarasota, Florida, then Scottsdale, Arizona, then in Bradenton, Florida, where he was a member of the Sarasota Yacht Club. He died on April 25, 1997.
