= John Stewart (constable of Stirling Castle) =

Scottish soldier

John Stewart was a Scottish soldier and Constable of Stirling Castle for James VI of Scotland.

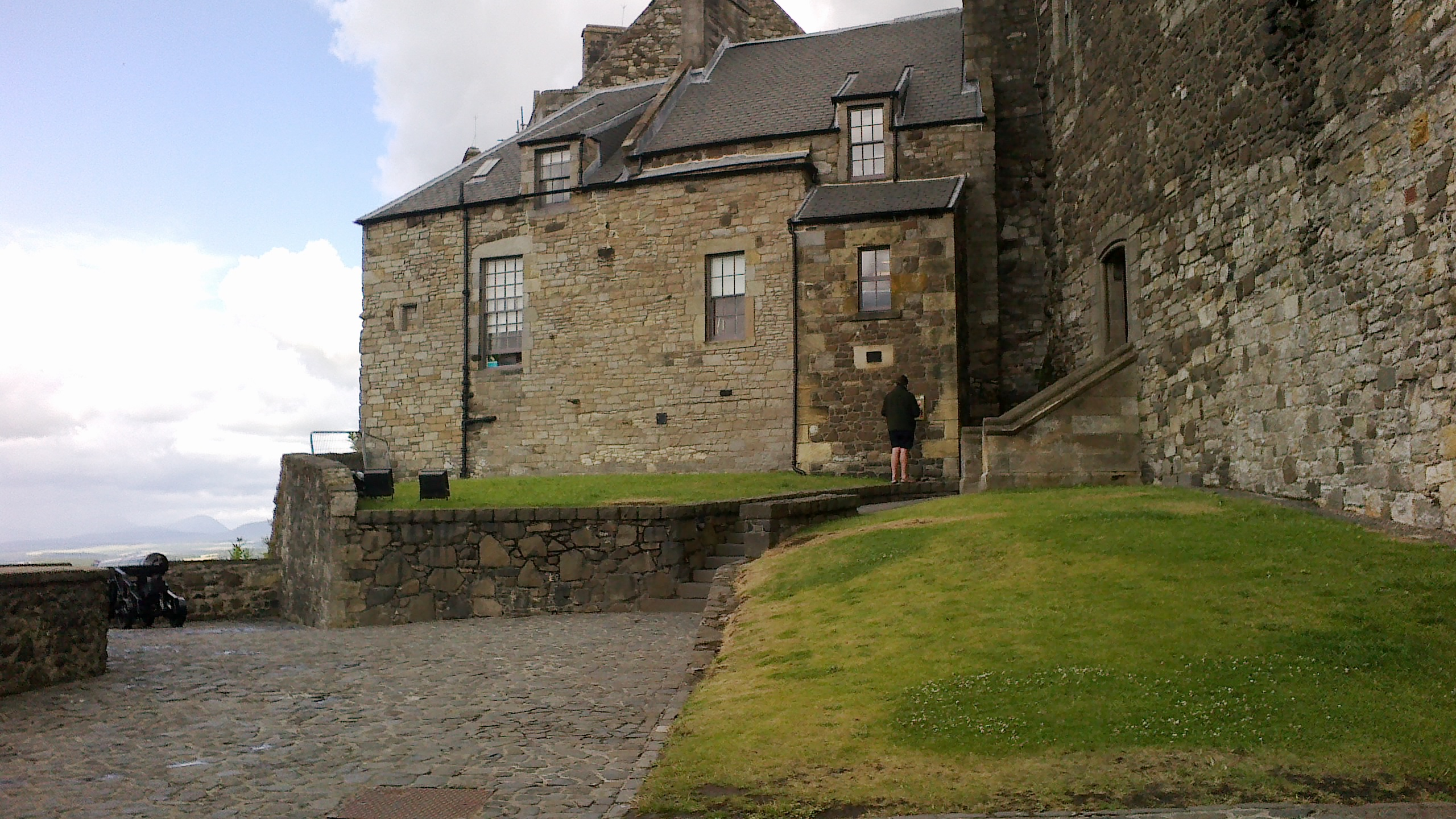
John Stewart supervised the building of a timber gallery at Stirling Castle so James VI could enjoy the view

He was known as "Master John Stewart", perhaps indicating a university education.

In 1576 he carried out improvements and repairs to Stirling castle, including a new timber gallery on the west side of the Palace, and repairs to the gatehouse. At this time, James VI was resident in the castle, in the care of Annabell Murray, Countess of Mar.

Stewart's account for the work at Stirling in 1576 survives in the National Records of Scotland. Timber and slates were brought to Stirling by boat on the River Forth. A blacksmith, John Cowan, made an iron support for the new doorway from the gallery into the passage that leads to the rooms above the king's outer chamber.

Stewart was ill in March 1581 and his duties were given to the gunner Michael Gardiner who became depute-keeper of Stirling Castle. When he recovered, the keeping of the castle was restored to him on 28 March, and on 4 April 1581, Stewart signed an inventory of the brass and iron cannon in the castle.

During the "Raid of Stirling", on 18 April 1584, Stewart was compelled to surrender the castle to the Earl of Mar. The castle was besieged and surrendered to the king's forces led by Colonel Stewart.

== Marriage, family, and the parable jewel ==
John Stewart married Margaret Makstoun or Maxtoun.

They had a son, also John Stewart, who was a varlet or valet in the king's chamber from March 1573.

A document in the National Records of Scotland notes that in 1590, Margaret Maxtoun assigned a debt for an elaborate locket or "tablet" owed to her by Colin Campbell of Glenorchy (who had died in 1583) for the benefit of her son John, who was to receive 100 French crowns and two dairy cows. The jewel, acquired by the Campbells around the year 1548, was set with a dozen precious stones, and depicted the Parable of the Great Banquet, described in Scots as:

grawin be goldsmytht wark how that Chryst maid a comparisone how that a certane king maid ane bankett and send furth his serviands to call in his jestis, and off thair answer and excuiss as it is contenit in the haly evangell thairupone

graven by goldsmith work how that Christ made a comparison how that a certain king made a banquet and sent forth his servants to call in his guests, and of their answers and excuses as it is contained in the Holy Gospel thereupon

The "answers and excuses" of the guests is a reference to Luke 14: 15–24, and Matthew 22: 1–14. In 1640, the Campbell family owned a gold enamelled "target" set with precious stones and said to have been a gift from James V of Scotland.

John Stewart, the valet, died in 1593. The royal master of work William Schaw ordered a carpenter in the Canongate, and royal gunner, David Selkirk, to make his coffin. His widow Lucrece Fleming, a daughter of Lord Fleming, married Robert Graham of the Fauld, a borderer, who died in 1600. James VI wrote to the English border warden Lord Scrope for help for her to secure his legacy.
