= Johnny Stuart (author) =

John Spencer Innes Stuart, known as Johnny Stuart (20 May 1940 – 12 July 2003), was a Scottish author, art collector and expert on Russian icons and Russian art who was also known for his interest in the British motorcycling rocker movement and even published a book on the subject. Stuart founded the Russian department at Sotheby's London auction house in 1976, developed it to its leading position in the market and was considered a leading expert in Russian art outside of Russia.

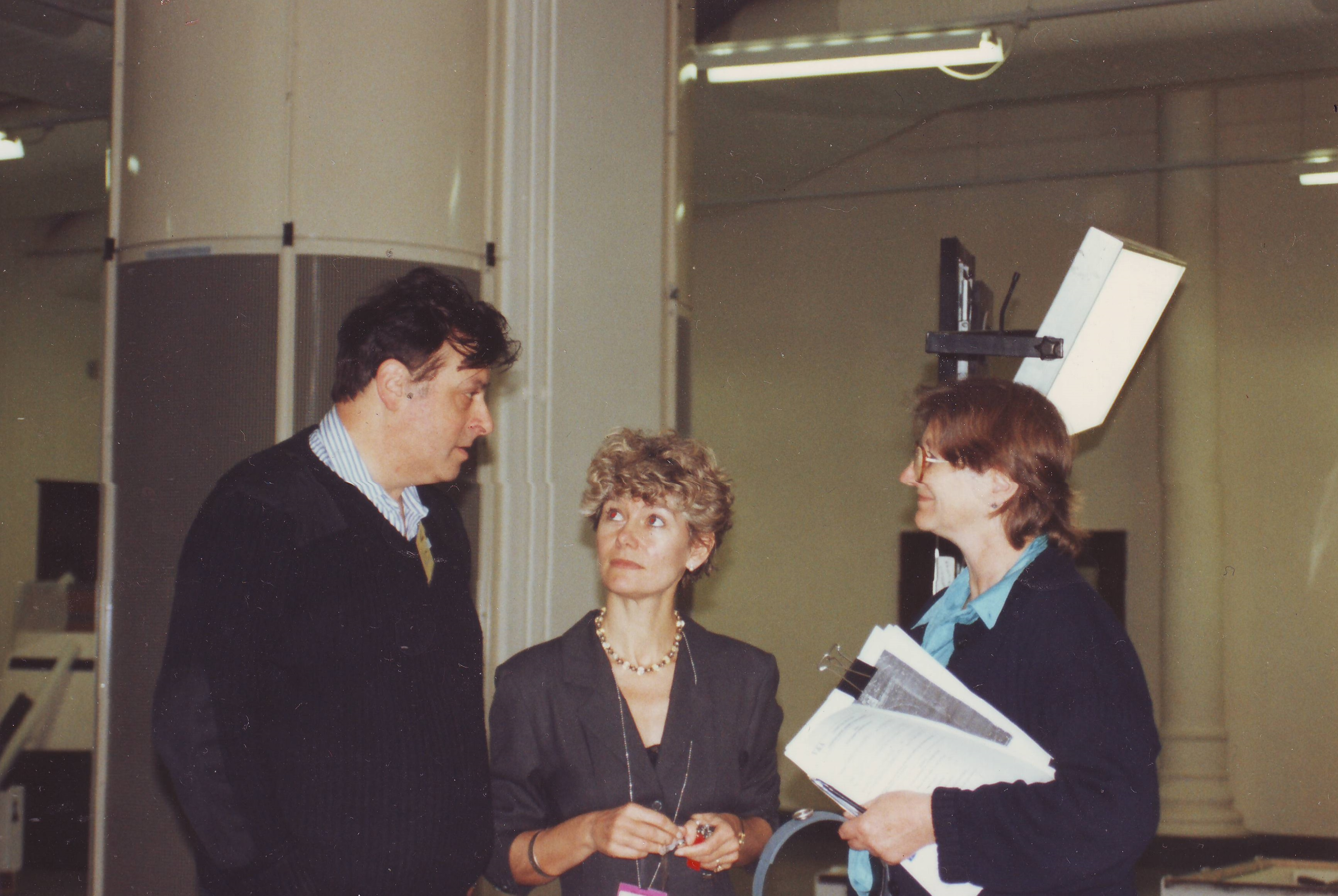
Johnny Stuart (left) and museum curators working on the Gates of Mystery at the Victoria and Albert Museum, London, 1990

Born to a farmer in Aberdeen in 1940, Stuart was educated at Eton College, where he studied with Wilfrid Blunt, brother of Anthony Blunt. He converted to Russian Orthodoxy at the age of 18 and studied Slavonic Studies at St John's College, Cambridge. He then travelled to the Soviet Union in the late 1960s, where his friend and expert on Russian avant-garde, author of The Great Experiment: Russian Art 1863-1922 Camilla Gray introduced him to Russian artistic circles in Moscow and Leningrad. While in the Soviet Union, Stuart studied with the legendary icon painter and restorer, Adolphe Ovtchinikov at the Grabar Art Conservation Centre.

He co-curated an exhibition of Russian icons – Gates of Mystery – at London's Victoria & Albert Museum in 1990, and was an advisor for their 1994 "British Street Style" exhibition to which he loaned items from his collection.

In 1987, Stuart's book Rockers! was first published, a seminal account of the rocker movement. His knowledge of British youth culture made him a guru for actors and pop stars including the Rolling Stones, Oliver Tobias, George Michael, Gary Numan, Billy Idol, Brian Setzer, Paul Simonon and Kylie Minogue, many of whom he befriended. Rockers! at one time "was reputedly the most shop-lifted book in London bookshops".

Little is known of Stuart's private dealership; however, the 15th century icon The Miracle of St George and the Dragon, now at the British Museum, was purchased from AXIA dealership, which also acknowledges the role of Johnny Stuart in its dealings. As Yanni Petsopoulos, the owner of AXIA recollected, Johnny Stuart was very fond of religious Byzantine and Russian art, even travelling to Mount Athos in order to understand better the Orthodox spiritual tradition. Stuart bequeathed the draft of his book Icons, The Triumph of Orthodoxy, to the owner of AXIA. It is unknown when or whether this draft is going to be published.

== Bibliography ==
- Ikons, Faber & Faber (1975).
- Russian & Greek Icons: From the Charles Pankow Collection of Russian & Greek Icons, Thirteenth Through the Nineteenth Century. Van Doren Gallery (1982).
- "Byzantine exhibition at the British Museum provides new insights but falls flat due to missed opportunities" in Art Newspaper (1 February 1995) Byzantine exhibition at the British Museum provides new insights but falls flat due to missed opportunities
- Rockers!, Plexus, ISBN 0859651258 (1987).
- St. Petersburg: Portrait of an Imperial City. Vendome (1990).
