= John Stewart (businessman) =

British businessman

- Born: John Morrison Stewart; May 1949 (age 76); Edinburgh, Scotland
- Occupations: Chairman, Legal & General; Chairman, Guide Dogs for the Blind
- Board member of: Legal & General; Financial Reporting Council

John Morrison Stewart (born May 1949) is a British businessman, the chairman of Legal & General.

John Morrison Stewart was born in Edinburgh in May 1949.

He has been the chairman of Legal & General since March 2010, a member of the court of the Bank of England, a non-executive director of the Financial Reporting Council and chairman of Guide Dogs for the Blind.

Stewart will retire from Legal & General in 2016.
