= 1970 Nebraska gubernatorial election =

- November 3, 1970
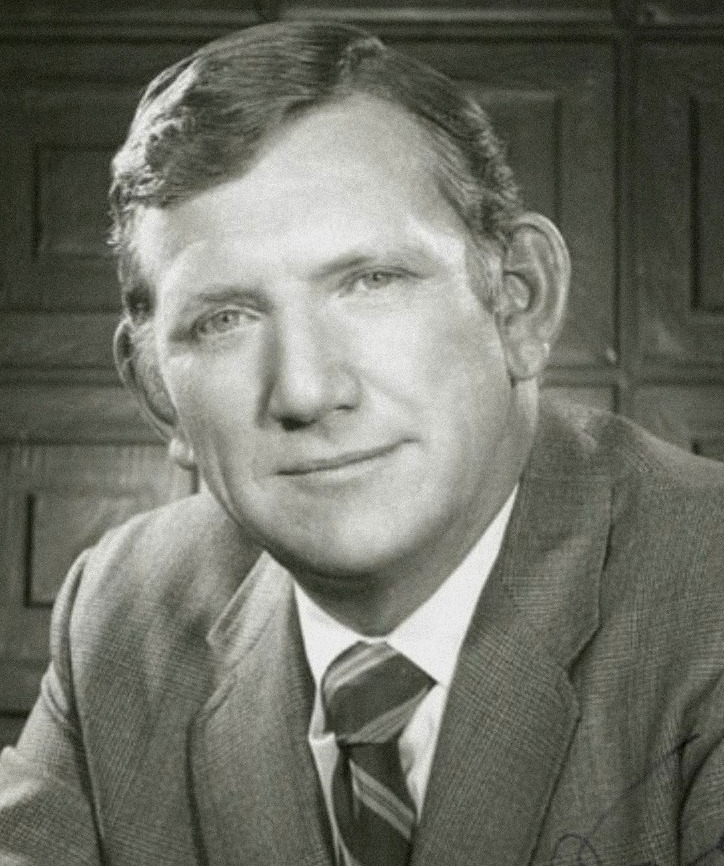

Nominee	James Exon	Norbert Tiemann
Party	Democratic	Republican
Popular vote	248,552	201,994
Percentage	53.84%	43.76%
- County results Exon: 40–50% 50–60% 60–70% 70–80% Tiemann: 40–50% 50–60% 60–70%
Governor before election
Norbert Tiemann
Republican
Elected Governor
James Exon
Democratic

The 1970 Nebraska gubernatorial election was held on November 3, 1970, and featured businessman James Exon, a Democrat, defeating incumbent Republican governor Norbert Tiemann.

== Democratic primary ==
=== Candidates ===
- Julius W. Burbach, member of the Nebraska Legislature
- James Exon, businessman and Chairman of the Nebraska Democratic Party
- Richard R. Larsen, former Nebraska State Treasurer

=== Results ===
Democratic primary results
Party	Candidate	Votes	%
Democratic	James Exon	54,972	44.71
Democratic	Julius W. Burbach	51,760	42.10
Democratic	Richard R. Larsen	15,602	12.69
Democratic	Write-in	616	0.50

== Republican primary ==
=== Candidates ===
- Clifton B. Batchelder, member of the Nebraska Legislature
- Harvey Grotzky, retired interior decorator
- Norbert Tiemann, incumbent governor

=== Results ===
Republican primary results
Party	Candidate	Votes	%
Republican	Norbert Tiemann (incumbent)	97,616	50.51
Republican	Clifton B. Batchelder	89,355	46.24
Republican	Harvey Grotzky	6,190	3.20
Republican	Write-in	95	0.05

== General election ==
=== Results ===
Nebraska gubernatorial election, 1970
Party	Candidate	Votes	%
Democratic	James Exon	248,552	53.84%
Republican	Norbert Tiemann (incumbent)	201,994	43.76%
American	Albert C. Walsh	10,913	2.36%
Write-in		160	0.04%
Total votes		461,619	100.00%
Democratic gain from Republican			

==== By county ====
County	James Exon Democratic		Norbert Tiemann Republican		Various candidates Other parties		Margin		Total
County	#	%	#	%	#	%	#	%	Total
Adams									
Antelope									
Arthur									
Banner									
Blaine									
Boone									
Box Butte									
Boyd									
Brown									
Buffalo									
Burt									
Butler									
Cass	3,058	57.63%	2,118	39.92%	130	2.45%	940	17.71%	5,306
Cedar									
Chase									
Cherry									
Cheyenne									
Clay									
Colfax									
Cuming									
Custer									
Dakota									
Dawes									
Dawson									
Deuel									
Dixon									
Dodge									
Douglas	62,172	55.22%	47,719	42.38%	2,698	2.40%	14,403	12.84%	112,589
Dundy									
Fillmore									
Franklin									
Frontier									
Furnas									
Gage									
Garden									
Garfield									
Gosper									
Grant									
Greeley									
Hall									
Hamilton									
Harlan									
Hayes									
Hitchcock									
Holt									
Hooker									
Howard									
Jefferson									
Johnson	1,362	60.70%	848	37.79%	34	1.52%	514	22.91%	2,244
Kearney									
Keith									
Keya Paha									
Kimball									
Knox									
Lancaster	17,764	36.65%	29,846	61.57%	861	1.78%	10,088	24.92%	48,471
Lincoln									
Logan									
Loup									
Madison									
McPherson									
Merrick									
Morrill									
Nance									
Nemaha									
Nuckolls									
Otoe									
Pawnee									
Perkins									
Phelps									
Pierce									
Platte									
Polk									
Red Willow									
Richardson									
Rock									
Saline	2,943	62.39%	1,704	36.12%	70	1.48%	1,293	26.27%	4,717
Sarpy	6,023	55.92%	4,331	40.21%	416	3.86%	1,692	15.71%	10,770
Saunders									
Scotts Bluff									
Seward									
Sheridan									
Sherman									
Sioux									
Stanton									
Thayer									
Thomas									
Thurston									
Valley									
Washington	2,527	56.27%	1,883	41.93%	81	1.80%	644	14.34%	4,491
Wayne									
Webster									
Wheeler									
York									
Totals	248,552	53.84%	201,994	43.76%	11,073	2.40%	46,558	10.01%	461,619

== See also ==
- 1970 Nebraska lieutenant gubernatorial election
