= Quaker Mill Company =

American oat mill company

The Quaker Mill Company was a 19th-century American oat mill company in Ravenna, Ohio. After merging with three other companies in 1901, the company became the Quaker Oats Company. Today it is a subsidiary of PepsiCo.

== History ==
Henry D. Seymour and William Heston founded the Quaker Mill in Ravenna. On 4 September 1877, Seymour trademarked the Quaker brand after reading an encyclopedia article on Quakers, who are officially called the Religious Society of Friends. The article ascribed integrity, honesty, and purity to the Quakers, which Seymour realized would be favorable attributes to impute to his company's breakfast cereal, particularly in an era of food impurities. By 1888, the company employed 83 people, and (in a tie with the Ravenna Glass Company) was Ravenna's largest employer.
