= Ferdinand Schumacher =

American activist (1822–1908)

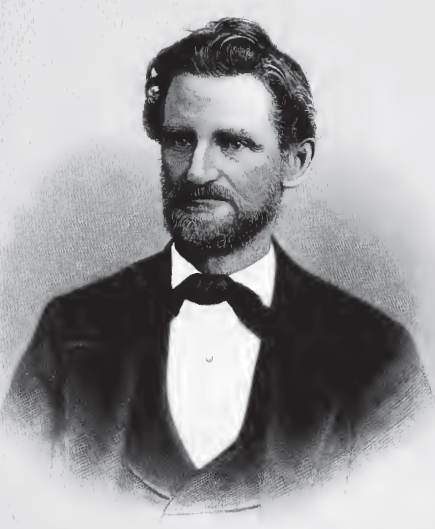

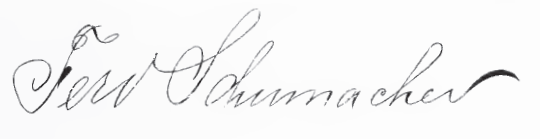

Ferdinand Schumacher (1822–1908), also known as The Oatmeal King, was an American entrepreneur and one of the founders of companies which merged to become the Quaker Oats Company.

== Biography ==
Ferdinand Schumacher was born in Celle, Kingdom of Hanover on March 30, 1822, the son of a merchant. He completed high school locally. He then apprenticed in the grocery business and learned how to make oatmeal using medieval technology. He pursued this, and clerked in a manufacturing business until age 28, when he and his brother Otto emigrated to the United States.

Schumacher farmed for two years and established a grocery trade in Akron, Ohio in 1852. Remembering that back in Germany, he used to grind oats and sell them as breakfast food, he decided to do the same in Akron, Ohio, in 1854. In the beginning, he encountered difficulty selling oatmeal because locals were used to oats as feed for livestock. He then found a new way of processing whole oats that involved an easy way to prepare and use oats as a table food. Ferdinand Schumacher started selling his oatmeal, and from there it branched out to the rest of the United States. In 1857, he rented water power on the Ohio Canal in northwest Akron to power a mill for production of oatmeal. In 1858, he added equipment for pearling barley. He continued adding to his plant and introduced steam power in 1875.

Ferdinand Schumacher married his cousin, Hermine Schumacher, in 1851. They had seven children, three of whom survived to adulthood. He was active in the temperance movement, and was strongly for prohibition. His wife was also a leader of temperance and benevolent women's organizations. Schumacher supported the erection of many churches.

Schumacher ran unsuccessfully for Ohio Secretary of State in 1872 and 1882, and Ohio Governor in 1883 as Prohibition Party nominee.
