= Henry Parsons Crowell =

Founder of the Quaker Oats Company

Henry Parsons Crowell (January 27, 1855, in Cleveland, Ohio – 1944) was an American businessman and philanthropist. In 1881, Crowell purchased the Quaker Mill Company, and subsequently the brand name Quaker, and launched the first breakfast cereal advertising campaign in a magazine. He also purchased the bankrupt Quaker Oat Mill Company. In 1901, he founded the Quaker Oats Company.

== Career ==
As the founder of the Quaker Oats Company, Henry Parsons Crowell helped influence the eating habits of Americans and in the process helped to create new methods of marketing and merchandising.

Crowell spent much of his life in business and philanthropy. For 40 years he was the chairman of the Board of Trustees of the Moody Bible Institute. The Henry Parsons Crowell and Susan Coleman Crowell Trust carefully states that the purpose of their personal family trust is to fund the teaching and active extension of the doctrines of evangelical Christianity.

== Legacies and contributions ==
Crowell donated over 70 percent of his wealth to the Crowell Trust. The Moody Bible Institute named the 12-story Crowell Hall building after him. In the United States, he was regarded as one of the most respected Christian businessmen in the early 20th century.

== Bibliography ==
Musser, Joe (1997). The Cereal Tycoon. Moody Press. ISBN 0-8024-1616-0.

Day, Richard Ellsworth, "Breakfast Table Autocrat The Life Story of Henry Parsons Crowell". Moody Press, Chicago, 1946.
