= Quaker Oats Company =

American food conglomerate

The Quaker Oats Company
- Trade name: Quaker
- Type: Subsidiary
- Traded as: NYSE: OAT (until 2001)
- Industry: Food
- Founded: September 4, 1877; 149 years ago (as Quaker Mill Company); Ravenna, Ohio, United States
- Founder: Henry Parsons Crowell
- Headquarters: 555 West Monroe Street, Chicago, Illinois, US
- Area served: Worldwide
- Key people: Robbert Rietbroek (Senior Vice President & General Manager)
- Products: Oats; Oatmeal (Porridge); Cereal; Snacks
- Parent: PepsiCo
- Website: quakeroats.com

The Quaker Oats Company, known as Quaker, is an American food conglomerate based in Chicago, Illinois. As Quaker Mill Company, the company was founded in 1877 in Ravenna, Ohio. In 1881, Henry Parsons Crowell bought the company and launched a national advertising campaign for Quaker Oats.

In 1911, the company acquired the Great Western Cereal Company. The iconic cylindrical package was introduced in 1915. The company's logo, which depicts a Quaker man, has had several iterations.

In 1983, Quaker acquired Stokely-Van Camp, Inc., the maker of Van Camp's and Gatorade. In 2001, PepsiCo bought Quaker Oats for $14 billion, primarily to acquire the Gatorade brand.

== History ==
=== Precursor miller companies ===
In the 1850s, Ferdinand Schumacher and Robert Stuart founded oat mills. Schumacher founded the German Mills American Oatmeal Company in Akron, Ohio, and Stuart founded the North Star Mills in Hearst, Ontario, then part of Rupert's Land. In 1870, Schumacher ran his first known cereal advertisement in the Akron Beacon Journal newspaper. In 1877, the Quaker Mill Company of Ravenna, Ohio, was founded.

According to some accounts, Quaker Mill partner Henry Seymour came up with the brand name after discovering an encyclopedia article about Quakers. He stated that the qualities describing Quakers, such as integrity, honesty, and purity, were traits that he wanted customers to associate with the company's product. According to the company, William Heston also said that he had selected the name. Quaker Mill Company held the trademark on the Quaker name. In Ravenna, Ohio, on September 4, 1877, Henry Seymour of the Quaker Mill Company applied for the first trademark for a breakfast cereal—"a figure of a man in 'Quaker garb'".

In 1879, John Stuart and his son Robert joined with George Douglas to form Imperial Mill and set up their operation in Chicago, Illinois. In 1881, Henry Parsons Crowell bought the Quaker Mill Company; the following year, he launched the first national magazine advertising campaign for breakfast cereal, introducing a cereal box that made buying in quantities other than bulk possible. He also bought the bankrupt Quaker Oat Mill Company in Ravenna and held the key positions of general manager, president, and chairman of the company from 1888 until late 1943, becoming known as the cereal tycoon. He donated more than 70% of his wealth to the Crowell Trust.

In 1888, the American Cereal Company was formed by the merger of seven major oat millers. Ferdinand Schumacher became president, Henry Crowell the general manager, and John Stuart the secretary-treasurer. In 1889, the American Cereal Company introduced the half-ounce trial size, and as a promotion, distributed one to every home in Portland, Oregon, via boys on bicycles. Later, this promotion was extended to other cities. A second promotion involved placing dinner plates within the then-regular (not round) boxes of oats.

=== Quaker Oats Company ===
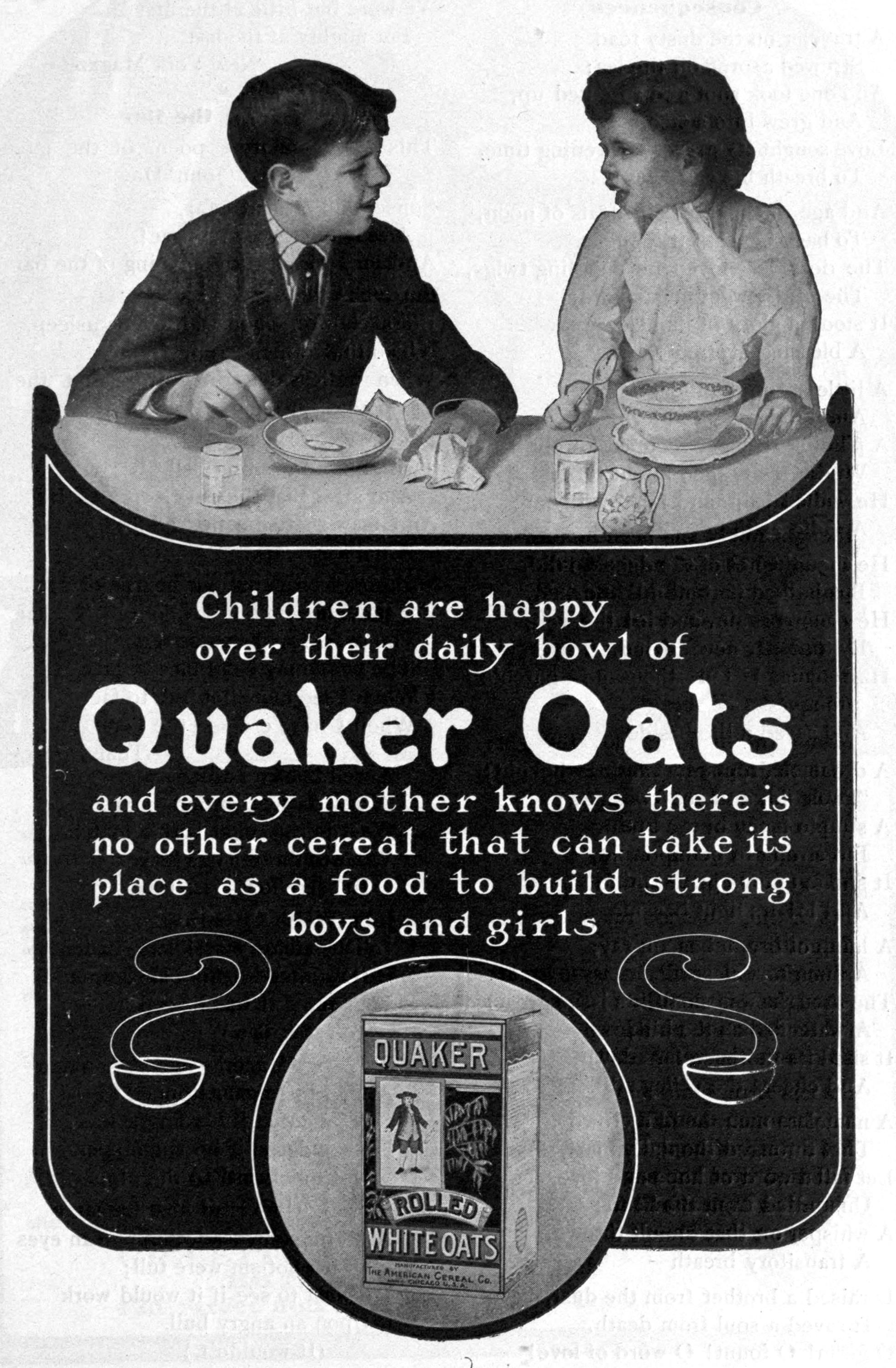
A 1905 magazine advertisement

In 1901, the Quaker Oats Company was founded in New Jersey with headquarters in Chicago, by the merger of four oat mills - the Quaker Mill Company in Ravenna, Ohio, which held the trademark on the Quaker name; the cereal mill in Cedar Rapids, Iowa, owned by John Stuart, his son Robert Stuart, and their partner George Douglas; the German Mills American Oatmeal Company in Akron, Ohio, owned by Schumacher; and the Rob Lewis & Co. American Oats and Barley Oatmeal Corporation. In the same year, the whole merged company was acquired by Crowell, who also bought the bankrupt Quaker Oat Mill Company, also in Ravenna.

In 1908, Quaker Oats introduced the first in a series of cookie recipes on the box. In 1911, Quaker Oats purchased the Great Western Cereal Company. The iconic cylindrical package made its first appearance in 1915. Later that year, Quaker offered the first cereal box premium to buyers. By sending in one dollar and the cutout picture of the "Quaker Man", customers received a double boiler for the cooking of oatmeal.

In the 1920s, Quaker introduced "Quaker Quick Oats", an early convenience food, and also offered a crystal radio set built in the same cylindrical canister as Quick Oats, with the same label, for US$1 plus two trademarks cut from Quaker Oats packages. In the 1930s, Quaker was one of the many companies using the Dionne Quintuplets for promotional purposes. The Quaker Oats mill in Cedar Rapids was photographed during the 1930s by Theodor Horydczak, who documented the building, operations, and factory workers at the plant.

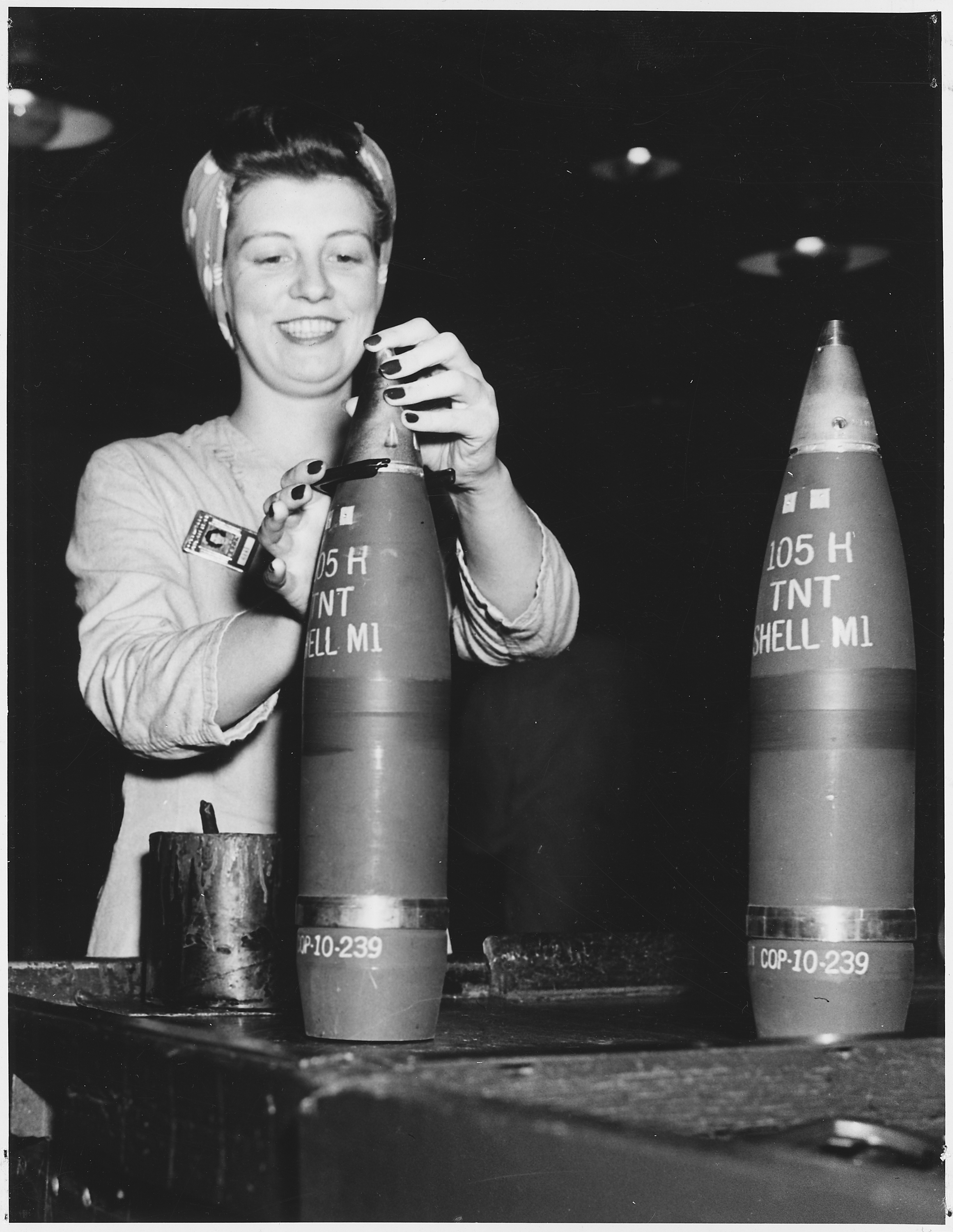
The company's contribution to the US war effort

During World War II, the company, through its subsidiary, Q. O. Ordnance Company, operated the Cornhusker Ordnance Plant (six miles west of Grand Island) as a government-owned, contractor-operated, 11,960-acre site. Construction began in March 1942, and production ended in August 1945. The plant manufactured millions of pieces of various artillery munitions.

In 1946, artist Jim Nash was commissioned to produce a head portrait of the Quaker Man, which became the basis for Haddon Sundblom's famous version of 1957.

In 1968, a plant was built in Danville, Illinois, which now makes Pearl Milling Company pancake mixes, Oat Squares, Life Cereals, Quaker Oh's, Bumpers, Quisp, King Vitamin Natural Granola Cereals, and Chewy granola bars, as well as puffed rice for use as an ingredient for other products in other plants.

In 1969, Quaker acquired Fisher-Price, a toy company. It was spun off in 1991.

In 1971, the company financed the making of the film Willy Wonka & the Chocolate Factory, based on the children's novel Charlie and the Chocolate Factory by Roald Dahl. In return, the company obtained a license to use a number of the product names mentioned in the film for candy bars. The film was considered a box-office disappointment at the time of release, and the film's original distributor, Paramount, eventually sold the rights back to Quaker Oats, which then sold the rights to Warner Bros. because the company wanted no involvement in the film business. The film became extremely popular in the 1980s via repeated television airings and home video sales.

In 1972, Quaker Oats purchased Louis Marx and Company, which had created one-quarter of all toys and trains manufactured in the mid-1950s. It sold the business after four years.

In 1982, Quaker Oats purchased US Games, a company that created games for the Atari 2600. It went out of business after one year. That same year, Quaker Oats acquired Florida-based orange juice plant Ardmore Farms, which it owned until selling it to Country Pure Foods in 1998.

In 1983, Quaker bought Stokely-Van Camp, Inc., makers of Van Camp's and Gatorade.

Quaker bought Snapple for $1.7 billion in 1994 and sold it to Triarc in 1997 for $300 million. Triarc sold it to Cadbury Schweppes for $1.45 billion in September 2000. It was spun off in May 2008 to its current owners, Dr Pepper Snapple Group.

In 1996, Quaker spun off its frozen-food business, selling it to Aurora Foods (which was bought by Pinnacle Foods in 2004).

In August 2001, Quaker Oats was acquired by PepsiCo for $14 billion, primarily for the Gatorade brand.

Starting in 1987 through the 1990s, actor Wilford Brimley appeared in television commercials for Quaker. In the commercials, he extolled the virtues and healthfulness of oat consumption, sometimes to a young child. "It's the right thing to do" was a common slogan during the commercials.

=== Major facility ===
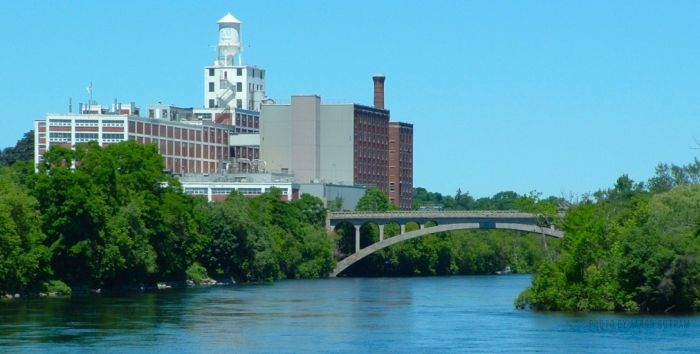
Quaker Oats facility in Peterborough, Ontario

The major Canadian production facility for Quaker Oats is located in Peterborough, Ontario. The factory was first established as the American Cereal Company in 1902 on the shores of the Otonabee River during that city's period of industrialization. At the time, the city was known as "The Electric City" due to its hydropower resources, attracting many companies to the site to take advantage of this source. The Trent–Severn Waterway also promised to provide an alternate shipping route from inland areas around the city. On December 11, 1916, the factory all but completely burned to the ground. When the smoke had settled, 23 people had died and Quaker was left with $2,000,000 in damages. Quaker went on to rebuild the facility, incorporating the few areas of the structure that were not destroyed by fire.

When PepsiCo purchased Quaker Oats in 2001, many brands were consolidated from facilities around Canada to the Peterborough location, which assumed the new QTG (Quaker Tropicana Gatorade) moniker. Local production includes Quaker Oatmeal, Quaker Chewy bars, Cap'n Crunch cereal, Pearl Milling Company instant pancake mixes and pancake syrups, Quaker Oat Bran and Corn Bran cereals, Gatorade sports drinks, the Propel fitness water subbrand, Tropicana juices, and various Frito-Lay snack products. Products are easily identified by the "manufactured by" address on the packaging. The Peterborough facility supplies the majority of Canada and exports to limited portions of the United States. The Quaker plant sells cereal production byproducts to companies that use them to create fire logs and pellets.

Until 2022, Quaker Oats had a major research and development (R&D) facility located in Barrington, Illinois. After numerous acquisitions, the site was renamed, but retained its R&D focus.

=== Land giveaways in cereal boxes ===
Starting in 1902, the company's oatmeal boxes came with a coupon redeemable for the legal deed to a tiny lot in Milford, Connecticut. The lots, sometimes as small as 10 feet by 10 feet, were carved out of a 15-acre, never-built subdivision called Liberty Park. A small number of children (or their parents), often residents living near Milford, redeemed their coupons for the free deeds and started paying the extremely small property taxes on the "oatmeal lots". The developer of the prospective subdivision hoped the landowners would hire him to build homes on the lots, although several tracts would need to be combined before building could start. The legal deeds created a large amount of paperwork for town tax collectors, who frequently could not find the property owners and received almost no tax revenue from them. In the mid-1970s, the town put an end to the oatmeal lots with a "general foreclosure" condemning nearly all of the property, which is now part of a BiC Corporation plant.

In 1955, Quaker Oats again gave away land as part of a promotion, this one tied to the Sergeant Preston of the Yukon television show in the United States. The company offered in its Puffed Wheat and Puffed Rice cereal boxes genuine deeds to land in the Klondike.

=== 2023–2024 product recalls ===
In 2023, concentrations of chlormequat, a pesticide known to cause reproductive and developmental issues in animals, in oat-based foods, including popular brands like Cheerios and Quaker Oats, were notably higher in 2023 compared to previous years. Quaker Oats Company issued numerous recalls of over 60 products starting from December 15 due to potential contamination with Salmonella bacteria, affecting various cereals such as Cap'n Crunch and Oatmeal Squares, as well as Gatorade protein bars and batches of Quaker Chewy granola bars and Quaker granola cereals. The latest recall, involving the Quaker Chewy Dipps Llama Rama bars, was announced on January 31, 2024.

== Logo ==
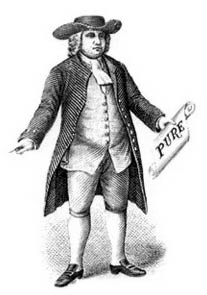
The first Quaker logo of 1877

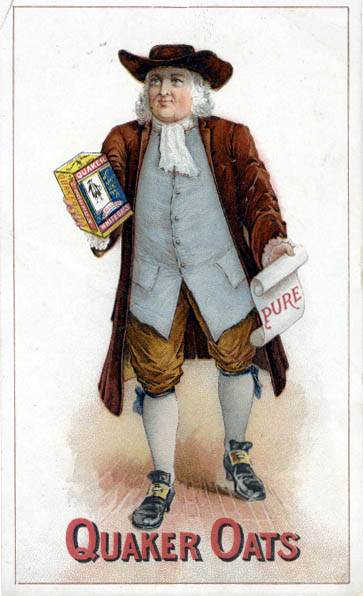
The Quaker Oats standing "Quaker Man" logo c. 1900

Starting in 1877, the Quaker Oats logo had a figure of a Quaker man depicted full-length, sometimes holding a scroll with the word "Pure" written across it, resembling the classic woodcuts of William Penn (founder of the Province of Pennsylvania), the 17th-century philosopher and early Quaker.

In 1946, graphic designer Jim Nash created a black-and-white, head-and-shoulders portrait of the smiling Quaker Man, and Haddon Sundblom's now-familiar color head-and-shoulders portrait (using fellow Coca-Cola artist Harold W. McCauley as the model) debuted in 1957. In 1965, a new advertising slogan was introduced: "Nothing is better for thee, than me".

A Quaker Oats box, featuring the pre-2012 "Quaker Man" logo

The monochromatic 1970 Quaker Oats Company logo, modeled after the Sundblom illustration, was created by Saul Bass, a graphic designer known for his motion-picture title sequences and corporate logos. In 2012, the company enlisted the firm of Hornall Anderson to give the "Quaker Man" a slimmer, somewhat younger look. The man is now sometimes referred to as "Larry" by insiders at Quaker Oats.

The company states that its current "Quaker Man" logo "does not represent an actual person. His image is that of a man dressed in Quaker garb, including a Quaker hat, chosen because the Quaker faith projected the values of honesty, integrity, purity, and strength".

The company has never had any ties with the Religious Society of Friends (Quakers). When the company was being built up, Quaker businessmen were known for their honesty (truth is often considered a Quaker testimony). The Quaker man was the first registered trademark for breakfast cereal in the United States; the character was registered on September 4, 1877.

Members of the Religious Society of Friends have occasionally expressed frustration at being confused with the Quaker Oats representation. Friends have twice protested the Quaker name being used for advertising campaigns seen as promoting violence. In 1990, some Quakers started a letter-writing campaign after a Quaker Oats advertisement depicted Popeye as a Quaker who used violence against aliens, sharks, and Bluto. Later in that decade, more letters were sparked by Power Rangers toys included in Cap'n Crunch cereal.

== Controversy ==
=== Research on children ===
From 1946 to 1953, researchers from Quaker Oats Company, MIT, and Harvard University carried out experiments at the Walter E. Fernald State School to determine how the minerals from cereals were metabolized. Fernald was a residential institution housing mostly boys with disabilities. The school asked parents of its students for permission to let their children be members of a Science Club, who then would participate in research and get special privileges, including trips to baseball games. The school informed parents that the children would be fed with a diet high in nutrients. They were not told that the food their children were fed contained radioactive calcium and iron, and the consent form contained no information indicating this. The information obtained from the experiments was to be used as part of an advertising campaign. The company was later sued because of the experiments. The lawsuit was settled on December 31, 1997, when MIT and Quaker Oats Company agreed to pay $1.85 million to the children who had been subjected to the experiments.

=== Trans fat content and litigation ===
In 2010, two California consumers filed a class action lawsuit against the Quaker Oats Company. The plaintiffs alleged that Quaker marketed its products as healthy, though they contained unhealthy trans fat. Specifically, Quaker's Chewy Granola Bars, Instant Oatmeal, and Oatmeal to Go Bars contained trans fat, yet their packaging featured claims like "heart healthy", "wholesome", and "smart choices made easy". The plaintiffs' complaint cited current scientific evidence that trans fat causes coronary heart disease and is associated with a higher risk of diabetes and some forms of cancer. In 2014, Quaker agreed to remove trans fats from its products, at a cost of $1.4 million, although the company denied false or misleading labelling.

== US brands ==
As of 2005, these are the product brands marketed under the Quaker Oats name in the US:

=== Breakfast cereals ===
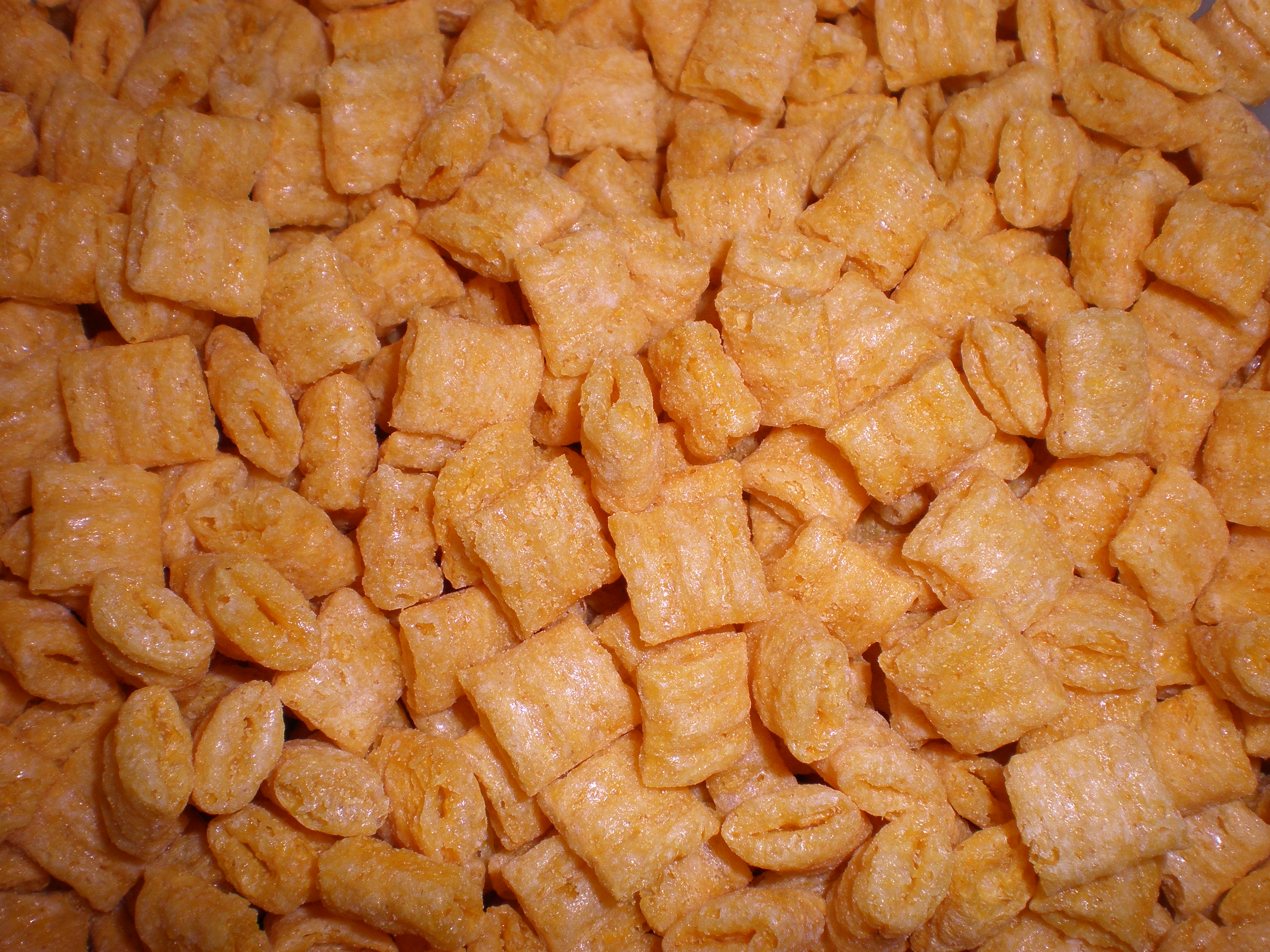
Cap'n Crunch cereal

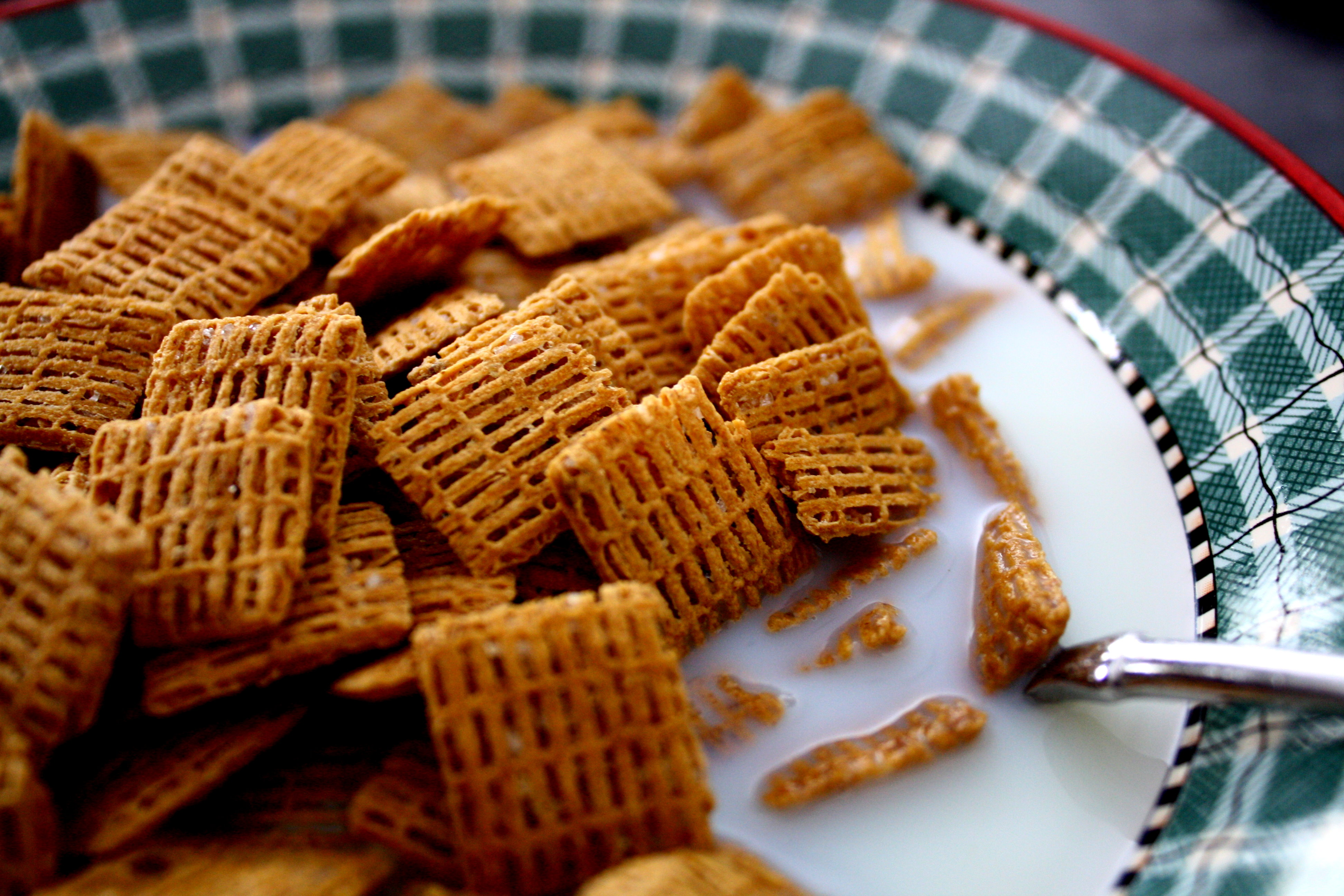
Life cereal

A 1981 TV commercial for the Quaker Corn Bran cereal

- Cap'n Crunch
- Life cereal
- Quisp
- Mother's Natural Foods
- Quaker 100% Natural Granola
- Kretschmer Wheat Germ
- Mr. T Cereal
- Muffets ("The round shredded wheat")
- Quaker Oatmeal Squares
- Quaker Toasted Oatmeal
- Quaker Oh's (sold to Post in 2014 and rebranded Honey Ohs!)
- Quaker Corn Bran
- Quaker Oat Bran
- Quaker Grits
- Quaker Oatmeal
- Quaker Instant Oatmeal
- Quaker Puffed Rice
- Quaker Puffed Wheat
- Quaker Oatmeal with Dinosaur Eggs
- Graham Bumpers
- Coco Bumpers
- King Vitaman

=== Other breakfast foods ===
- Quaker Oatmeal to Go (re-branded from Breakfast Squares in 2006)
- Pearl Milling Company (rebranded from Aunt Jemima in 2021)
- Quaker Breakfast Cookies

=== Snacks ===
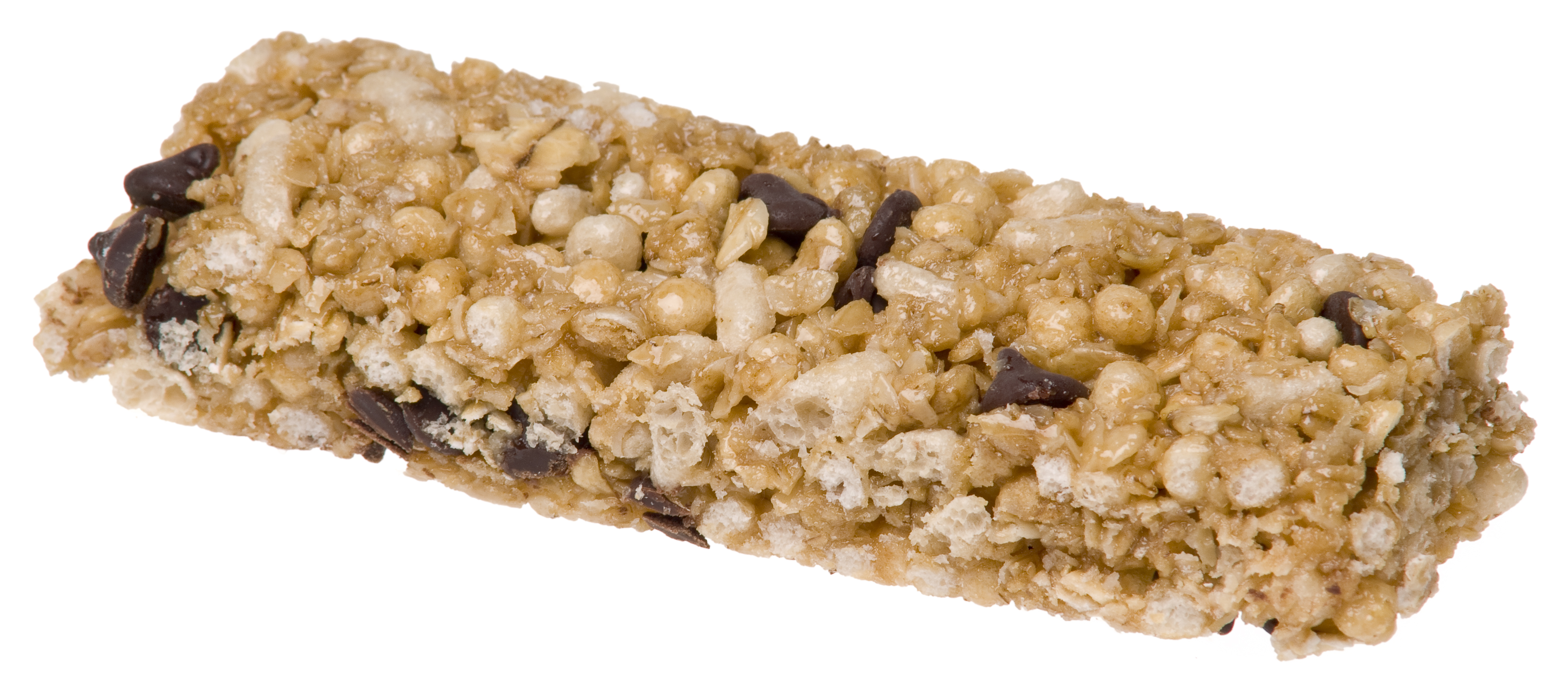
Chewy Granola Bar

- Quaker Crispy Minis (Rice Chips and Rice Cakes) (known as Snack-a-Jacks in the UK)
- Quakes Rice Snacks
- Quaker Soy Crisps
- Quaker Snack Bars
- Chewy Granola Bars
- Quaker Mini Delights
- Yogurt bars
- Quaker Oatmeal Cookies
- Greek Yogurt

=== Mixes ===
- Quaker Tortilla Mix
- Rice-A-Roni
- Pasta Roni
- Near East

=== Drinks ===
- Milk Chillers
- Tropicana fruit juices
- Sunbolt (defunct)

== UK brands ==
As of 2008, these are the product brands marketed under the Quaker Oats name in the UK:

=== Breakfast cereals ===
- Sugar Puffs (sold in 2006 to Big Bear t/a Honey Monster Foods)

=== Hot cereals ===
- Quaker Oats
- Oatso Simple (various flavours)
- Quaker Oats Super Goodness Porridge
- Quaker Oats Protein Porridge
- Scott's Porage Oats
- Scott's So Easy (the Scott's brand, previously a rival, now is also owned by Quaker)

=== Ready to eat cereal ===
- Harvest Crunch
- Quaker Wholesome Granola
- Quaker Oat Granola
- Quaker Oat Muesli
- Quaker Oat Crisp

=== Cereal bars ===
- Harvest Bar
- Oat Bars (Original with golden syrup or Mixed berry flavors)

=== Snacks ===
- New Quaker Fruit and Oat Squeeze
- New Quaker Porridge to Go
- Snack-a-Jacks

== The Netherlands brands ==
These are the product brands marketed under the Quaker Oats name in the Netherlands:

=== Hot cereals ===
- Quaker Oats
- Quaker Oats Express

=== Ready to eat cereal ===
- Quaker Cruesli
- Quaker Cruesli Zero Sugar
- Quaker Cruesli Colours
- Quaker Granola and Muesli

=== Cereal bars ===
- Oat Bars (Original with golden syrup or chocolate flavors)

== The Philippines brands ==
- Quaker Instant Oatmeal
- Quaker Oatmeal Cookies
- Quaker Instant Oats Caldo

== General references ==
- D'Antonio, Michael. The State Boys Rebellion. New York: Simon & Schuster, 2004.
- Page, Walter Hines; Page, Arthur Wilson (April 1901). "Advertisement: Quaker Oats". The World's Work: A History of Our Time. I: 676.
