= List of Harvard University politicians =

The list of Harvard University politicians includes notable politicians affiliated with Harvard University.

== Heads of state ==
Name	Class year	Notability	Reference(s)
John Adams (1735–1826)	College 1755; A.M. 1758	President of the United States	
John Quincy Adams (1767–1848)	College 1787; A.M. 1790	President of the United States	
Arnulfo Arias (1901–1988)	Medical 1925	President of Panama	
Duma Gideon Boko (born 1969)	Law 1993	President of Botswana	
George W. Bush (born 1946)	Business 1973	President of the United States	
Felipe Calderón Hinojosa (born 1962)	HKS 2000	President of Mexico	
Tsakhiagiin Elbegdorj (born 1963)	HKS 2002	President of Mongolia	
José María Figueres (born 1954)	HKS 1991	President of Costa Rica	
Han Duck-soo (born 1949)	PhD 1984	Acting president of South Korea	
Rutherford B. Hayes (1822–1893)	Law 1845	President of the United States	
John F. Kennedy (1917–1963)	College 1940	President of the United States; namesake of Harvard Kennedy School	
William Lai (1959-)	Chan 2003	President of the Republic of China	
Ma Ying-Jeou (born 1950)	Law 1981	President of the Republic of China (Taiwan)	
Miguel de la Madrid (1934–2012)	HKS 1965	President of Mexico	
Jamil Mahuad (born 1949)	HKS 1989	President of Ecuador	
Barack Obama (born 1961)	Law 1991	President of the United States	
Sebastián Piñera (born 1949)	PhD 1976	President of Chile	
Syngman Rhee (1875–1965)	A.M. 1909	President of South Korea	
Mary Robinson (born 1944)	Law 1968	President of Ireland	
Eduardo Rodríguez (born 1956)	HKS 1988	President of Bolivia	
Franklin Delano Roosevelt (1882–1945)	College 1904	President of the United States	
Theodore Roosevelt (1858–1919)	College 1880	President of the United States	
Carlos Salinas de Gortari (born 1948)	HKS 1973; A.M. 1976; PhD 1978	President of Mexico	
Maia Sandu (born 1972)	HKS 2010	President of Moldova	
Juan Manuel Santos	HKS 1981	President of Colombia	
Shankar Dayal Sharma (1918–1999)	Law 1940	President of India	
Ellen Johnson Sirleaf	HKS 1971	President of Liberia	
Álvaro Uribe (born 1953)	Extension 1993	President of Colombia	
Tharman Shanmugaratnam (born 1957)	HKS 1989	President of Singapore	

== Heads of government ==
Name	Class year	Notability	Reference(s)
Abdiweli Mohamed Ali (born 1965)	HKS – 1999	President of Puntland; prime minister of Somalia	
Benazir Bhutto (1953–2007)	College 1973	Prime minister of Pakistan	
Gro Harlem Brundtland (born 1939)	Master of Public Health – 1965	Prime minister of Norway	
Mark Carney (born 1965)	A.B. 1988	Prime minister of Canada	
Roberto Dañino (born 1951)	Law	Prime minister of Peru	
Tom Davis (1917–2007)	Master of Public Health 1952	Prime minister of the Cook Islands	
Benedikt Sigurðsson Gröndal (1924–2010)	College 1946	Prime minister of Iceland	
Jafar Hassan (born 1968)		Prime minister of Jordan	
William Lyon Mackenzie King (1874–1950)	A.M. 1898; PhD 1909	Prime minister of Canada	
Lee Hsien Loong (born 1952)	HKS 1980	Prime minister of Singapore	
Beatriz Merino (born 1947)	Law	Prime minister of Peru	
Najib Mikati (born 1955)	2004 – Business	Prime minister of Lebanon	
Kyriakos Mitsotakis (born 1968)	College 1990	Prime minister of Greece	
Miklós Németh (born 1948)	GSAS 1976	Prime minister of Hungary	
Fan Noli (1882–1965)	College 1912	Prime minister of Albania	
Nguyen Xuan Oanh (1921–2003)	HBS	Prime minister of South Vietnam	
Andreas Papandreou (1919–1996)	A.M. 1942; PhD 1943; lecturer and associate professor	Prime minister of Greece	
Kiril Petkov (born 1980)		Prime minister of Bulgaria	
Omar Razzaz (born 1961)		Prime minister of Jordan	
Samir Rifai (born 1966)	College 1988	Prime minister of Jordan	
Zaid al-Rifai (1936–2024)	College 1957	Prime minister of Jordan	
Antonis Samaras (born 1951)	HBS 1976	Prime minister of Greece	
Maia Sandu (born 1972)	HKS	Prime minister of Moldova	
Alfred Sant (born 1948)	HBS 1979	Prime minister of Malta	
Edward Seaga (1930–2019)	College 1952	Prime minister of Jamaica	
Aziz Sedki (1920–2008)	College 1950	Prime minister of Egypt	
Frederick Sumaye (born 1950)	HKS 2007	Prime minister of Tanzania	
Tshering Tobgay (born 1965)	HKS 2004	Prime minister of Bhutan	
Pierre Trudeau (1919–2000)	HKS 1945	Prime minister of Canada	
Lawrence Wong (born 1972)	HKS 2004	Prime minister of Singapore	

== U.S. cabinet secretaries ==
Name	Class year	Notability	Reference(s)
Spencer Abraham (born 1952)	Law 1979	U.S. secretary of energy, U.S. senator	
Dean Acheson (1893–1971)	Law 1918	United States secretary of state	
Alexander Acosta (born 1969)	College 1990, Law 1994	United States secretary of labor	
Brock Adams (1927–2004)	Law 1952	United States secretary of transportation	
Charles Francis Adams III (1866–1954)	College 1888; Law 1892	United States secretary of the Navy	
Bruce Babbitt (born 1938)	Law 1965	United States secretary of the interior, governor of Arizona	
Robert Bacon (1860–1919)	College 1880	United States secretary of state	
Joseph Barr (1918–1996)	A.M. 1941	United States secretary of the treasury	
William Bennett (born 1943)	Law 1971	United States secretary of education, activist	
Francis Biddle (1886–1968)	College 1909; Law 1911	United States attorney general	
Charles Bonaparte (1851–1921)	College 1870, Law 1872	United States attorney general	
Nicholas F. Brady (born 1930)	Business 1954	United States secretary of the treasury	
James H. Burnley IV (born 1948)	Law 1973	United States secretary of transportation	
Sylvia Mathews Burwell (born 1965)	College 1987	U.S. secretary of Health and Human Services	
Pete Buttigieg (born 1982)	College 2004	United States secretary of transportation, candidate for president in 2020, mayor of South Bend, Indiana	
Joseph Califano (born 1931)	Law 1955	U.S. secretary of Health, Education, and Welfare	
Frank Carlucci (1930–2018)	Business 1955	United States secretary of defense	
Julián Castro (born 1974)	Law 2000	United States Secretary of Housing and Urban Development	
Elaine Chao (born 1953)	Business 1979	United States secretary of labor, United States secretary of transportation	
Michael Chertoff (born 1953)	College 1975; Law 1978	U.S. secretary of Homeland Security	
Henry Cisneros (born 1947)	HKS 1973	U.S. secretary of Housing and Urban Development	
William Thaddeus Coleman Jr. (1920–2017)	Law 1946	United States secretary of transportation	
John T. Connor (1914–2000)	Law 1939	United States secretary of commerce	
Caleb Cushing (1800–1878)	College 1817	United States attorney general	
Charles Devens (1820–1891)	College 1838, Law 1840	United States attorney general	
Samuel Dexter (1761–1816)	College 1781	United States secretary of the treasury	
C. Douglas Dillon (1909–2003)	College 1931	United States secretary of the treasury	
Elizabeth Dole (born 1936)	Law 1965	United States secretary of transportation, United States secretary of labor	
Shaun Donovan (born 1966)	College 1987; HKS 1995	United States Secretary of Housing and Urban Development, Director of the Office of Management and Budget, running for Mayor of New York City	
Arne Duncan (born 1964)	College 1987	United States secretary of education	
Mark Esper (born 1964)	Kennedy 1995	United States secretary of defense	
William M. Evarts (1818–1901)	Law 1840	United States attorney general, United States secretary of state	
Edward Everett (1794–1865)	College 1811; A.M. 1814	United States secretary of state	
Charles S. Fairchild (1842–1920)	College 1863, Law 1865	United States secretary of the treasury	
Barbara Hackman Franklin (born 1940)	Business 1964	United States secretary of commerce	
Alberto Gonzales (born 1955)	Law 1982	United States attorney general	
Jennifer Granholm (born 1959)	Law 1987	Secretary of Energy, Governor of Michigan	
Pete Hegseth (born 1980)	Kennedy 2013	United States secretary of defense	
Christian Herter (1895–1966)	College 1915	United States Secretary of State	
Ebenezer R. Hoar (1816–1895)	College 1835	United States attorney general	
Donald Hodel (born 1935)	College 1957	United States secretary of the interior, United States secretary of energy	
David F. Houston (1866–1940)	College 1892	United States secretary of agriculture	
Robert F. Kennedy (1925–1968)	College 1948	United States attorney general, U.S. senator	
Robert F. Kennedy Jr. (born 1954)	College 1976	U.S. secretary of Health and Human Services	
Cameron Kerry (born 1950)	College 1972	United States secretary of commerce	
John King Jr. (born 1975)	College 1995	United States secretary of education	
Henry Kissinger (1923–2023)	College 1950, M.A. 1951, PhD 1954	United States secretary of state	
Richard Kleindienst (1923–2000)	College 1947; Law 1950	United States attorney general	
Jack Lew (born 1955)	College 1978	United States secretary of the treasury	
Drew Lewis (1931–2016)	Business 1955	United States secretary of transportation	
Levi Lincoln Sr. (1749–1820)	College 1772	United States attorney general	
Robert Todd Lincoln (1843–1926)	College 1864	United States secretary of war, son of Abraham Lincoln	
Robert A. Lovett (1895–1986)	Law, 1919, Business 1921	United States secretary of defense	
Loretta Lynch (born 1959)	College 1981, Law 1984	United States attorney general	
James Thomas Lynn (1927–2010)	Law 1951	U.S. secretary of Housing and Urban Development	
Neil H. McElroy (1904–1972)	College 1925	United States secretary of defense	
Robert McNamara (1916–2009)	Business 1939	United States secretary of defense	
Ogden L. Mills (1884–1937)	College 1904, Law 1907	United States secretary of the treasury	
William Henry Moody (1853–1917)	College 1876	United States attorney general	
Vivek Murthy (born 1977)	College 1998	Surgeon General of the United States	
Richard Olney (1835–1917)	Law 1858	United States secretary of state	
Henry Paulson (born 1946)	Business 1970	United States secretary of the treasury	
Thomas Perez (born 1961)	Law 1987, HKS 1987	United States secretary of labor, chairman of the Democratic National Committee	
Timothy Pickering (1745–1829)	College 1763	United States secretary of state, United States secretary of war	
Mike Pompeo (born 1963)	Law 1994	United States secretary of state, former director of the Central Intelligence Agency, U.S. representative	
Penny Pritzker (born 1959)	College 1981	United States secretary of commerce	
Donald Regan (1918–2003)	College 1940	United States secretary of the treasury	
Janet Reno (1938–2016)	Law 1963	United States attorney general	
Elliot Richardson (1920–1999)	College 1941, Law 1947	United States secretary of defense, United States attorney general	
William Adams Richardson (1821–1896)	College 1843	United States secretary of the treasury	
Tom Ridge (born 1946)	College 1967	U.S. secretary of Homeland Security	
Wilbur Ross (born 1937)	Business 1961	United States secretary of commerce	
Robert E. Rubin (born 1938)	College 1960	United States secretary of the treasury; chairman of Citigroup	
James Schlesinger (1929–2014)	College 1950; A.M. 1952; PhD 1956	United States secretary of defense, United States secretary of energy	
William French Smith (1917–1990)	Law 1942	United States attorney general	
Henry L. Stimson (1867–1950)	A.M. 1889	United States secretary of state, United States secretary of war	
Julie Su (born 1969)	Law 1994	United States secretary of labor (acting)	
Lawrence Summers (born 1954)	PhD 1982; president (2001–2006); professor	United States Secretary of the Treasury	
Elihu B. Washburne (1816–1887)	Law 1840	United States secretary of state	
Robert C. Weaver (1907–1997)	College 1934	U.S. secretary of Housing and Urban Development	
Sinclair Weeks (1893–1972)	College 1914	United States secretary of commerce	
Caspar Weinberger (1917–2006)	College 1938; Law 1941	United States secretary of defense	
Willard Wirtz (1912–2010)	Law 1937	United States secretary of labor	

== U.S. governors ==
Name	Class year	Notability	Reference(s)
Aníbal Acevedo Vilá (born 1962)	Law 1987	Governor of Puerto Rico	
Samuel Adams (1722–1803)	College 1740; A.M. 1743	Governor of Massachusetts, organizer of Boston Tea Party	
Henry Watkins Allen (1820–1866)	Law 1858	Governor of Louisiana	
Benjamin Ames (1778–1835)	College 1803	Governor of Maine	
Charlie Baker (born 1956)	College 1979	Governor of Massachusetts	
Nathaniel B. Baker (1818–1876)	College 1839	Governor of New Hampshire	
Robert P. Bass (1873–1960)	College 1896	Governor of New Hampshire	
Percival Proctor Baxter (1876–1969)	Law 1901	Governor of Maine	
Franklin S. Billings (1862–1935)	College 1885	Governor of Vermont	
James Bowdoin (1726–1790)	College 1745	Governor of Massachusetts	
John Q. A. Brackett (1842–1918)	College 1865, Law 1868	Governor of Massachusetts	
Robert F. Bradford (1902–1983)	College 1923	Governor of Massachusetts	
Roger Branigin (1902–1975)	Law	Governor of Indiana	
Phil Bredesen (born 1943)	College 1967	Governor of Tennessee	
Owen Brewster (1888–1961)	Law 1913	Governor of Maine	
J. Melville Broughton (1888–1949)	Law 1913	Governor of North Carolina	
C. Farris Bryant (1914–2002)	Law 1938	Governor of Florida	
Alexander Bullock (1816–1882)	Law 1840	Governor of Massachusetts	
Brendan Byrne (1924–2018)	Law 1950	Governor of New Jersey	
John Lee Carroll (1830–1911)	Law 1851	Governor of Maryland	
Prentice Cooper (1895–1965)	Law 1921	Governor of Tennessee	
Channing H. Cox (1879–1968)	Law 1904	Governor of Massachusetts	
Robert B. Crosby (1911–2000)	Law 1935	Governor of Nebraska	
Ron DeSantis (born 1978)	Law 2005	Governor of Florida	
Jim Doyle (born 1945)	Law 1972	Governor of Wisconsin	
Alfred E. Driscoll (1902–1975)	Law 1928	Governor of New Jersey	
Pierre S. du Pont, IV (1935–2021)	Law 1963	Governor of Delaware, U.S. presidential candidate	
Michael Dukakis (born 1933)	Law 1960	Governor of Massachusetts, 1988 Democratic U.S. presidential nominee	
George Howard Earle III (1890–1914)	College 1912	Governor of Pennsylvania	
Joseph B. Ely (1881–1956)	Law 1905	Governor of Massachusetts	
William Eustis (1753–1825)	College 1772	Governor of Massachusetts	
William Tudor Gardiner (1892–1953)	Law 1917	Governor of Maine	
Booth Gardner (1936–2013)	Business 1963	Governor of Washington	
Lucius F. C. Garvin (1841–1922)	Medical 1867	Governor of Rhode Island	
Samuel Goddard (1919–2006)	College 1941	Governor of Arizona	
Hugh Gregg (1917–2003)	Law 1942	Governor of New Hampshire	
Curtis Guild Jr. (1860–1915)	College 1881	Governor of Massachusetts	
John Hancock (1737–1793)	College 1754	President of the Continental Congress, first governor of Massachusetts	
Maura Healey (born 1971)	College 1992	Governor of Massachusetts and attorney general of Massachusetts	
Christian Herter (1895–1966)	College 1915	Governor of Massachusetts	
Horace Hildreth (1902–1988)	Law 1928	Governor of Maine	
George Hoadly (1826–1902)	Law 1844	Governor of Ohio	
Bob Holden (born 1949)	HKS 1976	Governor of Missouri	
Linwood Holton (1923–2021)	Law 1949	Governor of Virginia	
Richard B. Hubbard (1832–1901)	Law 1853	Governor of Texas	
Tim Kaine (born 1958)	Law 1983	Governor of Virginia	
Edward Kent (1802–1877)	College 1821	Governor of Maine	
John King (1916–1996)	College 1938	Governor of New Hampshire	
Everett J. Lake (1871–1948)	College 1890	Governor of Connecticut	
Ned Lamont (born 1954)	College 1976	Governor of Connecticut	
Frank Licht (1916–1987)	Law 1941	Governor of Rhode Island	
Levi Lincoln Jr. (1782–1868)	College 1802	Governor of Massachusetts	
John Davis Lodge (1903–1985)	College 1925; Law 1929	Governor of Connecticut	
John Davis Long (1838–1915)	College 1857	Governor of Massachusetts	
John Lynch (born 1952)	Business 1979	Governor of New Hampshire	
Ray Mabus (born 1948)	Law 1976	Governor of Mississippi	
Kenneth Mapp (born 1955)	Kennedy 1999	Governor of the United States Virgin Islands	
Jim McGreevey (born 1957)	Education 1982	Governor of New Jersey	
Paul V. McNutt (1891–1955)	Law 1916	Governor of Indiana	
Carl E. Milliken (1877–1961)	College 1899	Governor of Maine	
Phil Murphy (born 1957)	College 1979	Governor of New Jersey	
Charles Paine (1799–1853)	College 1816	Governor of Vermont	
Deval Patrick (born 1956)	College 1978; Law 1982	Governor of Massachusetts	
Endicott Peabody (1920–1997)	College 1942; Law 1948	Governor of Massachusetts	
Sylvester Pennoyer (1831–1902)	Law 1854	Governor of Oregon	
Charles Poletti (1903–2002)	College 1924, Law 1928	Governor of New York	
Robert E. Quinn (1894–1975)	Law 1918	Governor of Rhode Island	
William F. Quinn (1919–2006)	Law 1947	Governor of Hawaii	
Gina Raimondo (born 1971)	College 1993	Governor of Rhode Island	
Bruce Rauner (born 1957)	Business 1981	Governor of Illinois	
John H. Reed (1921–2012)	Naval Supply 1944	Governor of Maine	
George D. Robinson (1834–1896)	College 1856	Governor of Massachusetts	
Buddy Roemer (1943–2021)	College 1964; Business 1967	Governor of Louisiana	
Mitt Romney (born 1947)	Business 1975; Law 1975	Governor of Massachusetts, 2012 Republican U.S. presidential nominee	
William Russell (1857–1896)	College 1877	Governor of Massachusetts	
George L. Sheldon (1870–1960)	1893	Governor of Nebraska	
Milward L. Simpson (1897–1993)	Law 1925	Governor of Wyoming	
Samuel E. Smith (1788–1860)	College 1808	Governor of Maine	
Richard Snelling (1927–1991)	College 1948	Governor of Vermont	
Eliot Spitzer (born 1959)	Law 1984	Governor of New York	
Josh Stein (born 1966)	Law 1995	Governor of North Carolina	
Caleb Strong (1745–1819)	College 1763	Governor of Massachusetts	
Increase Sumner (1746–1799)	College 1763	Governor of Massachusetts	
Bruce Sundlun (1920–2011)	Law 1949	Governor of Rhode Island	
J. Fife Symington III (born 1945)	College 1968	Governor of Arizona	
Jonathan Trumbull (1710–1785)	College 1727; A.M. 1730	Governor of Connecticut	
Jonathan Trumbull Jr. (1740–1809)	College 1759	Governor of Connecticut; son of John Trumbull class of 1727; served as U.S. speaker of the House and U.S. senator	
Jim Guy Tucker (born 1943)	College 1964	Governor of Arkansas	
David Walters (born 1951)	Business 1975	Governor of Oklahoma	
Mark Warner (born 1954)	Law 1980	Governor of Virginia, U.S. senator, co-founder of Nextel	
William Weld (born 1945)	College 1966; Law 1970	Governor of Massachusetts	
William Pinkney Whyte (1824–1908)	Law 1844	Governor of Maryland	
Joseph H. Williams (1814–1896)	College 1830	Governor of Maine	
Augustus E. Willson (1846–1931)	College 1865, Law 1872	Governor of Kentucky	
Roger Wolcott (1847–1900)	College 1870, Law 1874	Governor of Massachusetts	
Glenn Youngkin (born 1966)	Business 1994	Governor of Virginia, co-CEO of The Carlyle Group	

== U.S. senators ==
Name	Class year	Notability	Reference(s)
Spencer Abraham (born 1952)	Law 1978		
Brock Adams (1927–2004)	Law 1952		
Samuel G. Arnold (1821–1880)	Law 1845		
Charles G. Atherton (1804–1853)	College 1822		
Robert Woodward Barnwell (1801–1882)	College 1821		
Jeff Bingaman (born 1943)	College 1965		
Hiram Bingham III (1875–1956)	PhD. 1905		
Richard Blumenthal (born 1946)	College 1967		
Mike Braun (born 1954)	Business 1978		
Robert J. Bulkley (1880–1965)	College 1902, Law 1906		
Edward R. Burke (1880–1968)	Law 1911		
Harold Hitz Burton (1888–1964)	Law 1911		
John Chafee (1922–1999)	Law 1950		
Christopher G. Champlin (1768–1840)	College 1786		
William E. Chandler (1835–1917)	Law 1854		
David Worth Clark (1902–1955)	Law 1925		
Joseph S. Clark (1901–1990)	College 1923		
Edward P. Costigan (1874–1939)	College 1899		
Tom Cotton (born 1977)	College 1998, Law 2002		
Samuel C. Crafts (1768–1853)	College 1790		
Mike Crapo (born 1951)	Law 1977		
Ted Cruz (born 1970)	Law 1995		
John Culver (1932–2018)	College 1954; Law 1962		
Bronson M. Cutting (1888–1935)	College 1910		
Charles Cutts (1769–1846)	College 1789		
Tristram Dalton (1738–1817)	College 1755		
William F. De Saussure (1792–1870)	College 1810		
Samuel Dexter (1761–1816)	College 1781		
Elizabeth Dole (born 1936)	A.M. 1960; Law 1965	U.S. presidential candidate	
Thomas Eagleton (1929–2007)	Law 1953	1972 Democratic U.S. vice presidential nominee	
Sam Ervin (1896–1985)	Law 1922		
James B. Eustis (1834–1899)	Law 1854		
Russ Feingold (born 1953)	Law 1979		
Hiram Fong (1906–2004)	Law 1935		
Dwight Foster (1757–1823)	College 1784		
Al Franken (born 1951)	College 1973	Comedian, actor	
Bill Frist (born 1952)	Medical 1978	Majority leader	
Ruben Gallego (born 1979)	College 2002		
David Gambrell (1929–2021)	Law 1952		
Peter G. Gerry (1879–1957)	College 1901		
Guy D. Goff (1866–1933)	Law 1891		
Benjamin Goodhue (1748–1814)	College 1766		
Christopher Gore (1758–1827)	College 1776		
Bob Graham (1936–2024)	Law 1962	Governor of Florida, U.S. presidential candidate	
Ernest Gruening (1887–1974)	College 1907; Medical 1912		
Edward Gurney (1914–1996)	Law 1938		
Frederick Hale (1874–1963)	College 1896		
Floyd Haskell (1916–1998)	College 1937; Law 1941		
William Hathaway (1924–2013)	College 1949; Law 1953		
H. John Heinz (1938–1991)	Business 1963		
Anthony Higgins (1840–1912)	Law 1864		
George Frisbie Hoar (1826–1904)	College 1846		
Henry F. Hollis (1869–1949)	College 1892		
Richard C. Hunter (1884–1941)	Law 1910		
James Jeffords (1934–2014)	Law 1962		
Daniel T. Jewett (1807–1906)	Law 1833		
Tim Kaine (born 1958)	Law 1983	Governor of Virginia	
Kenneth Keating (1900–1975)	Law 1923	U.S. presidential candidate	
James P. Kem (1890–1965)	Law 1913		
Edward Kennedy (1932–2009)	College 1956; honorary degree 2008	U.S. presidential candidate	
Henry W. Keyes (1862–1938)	College 1887		
Rufus King (1755–1827)	College 1777		
Paul G. Kirk (born 1938)	1960, Harvard Law 1968		
Herbert Kohl (1935–2023)	Business 1958		
Carl Levin (1934–2021)	Law 1959		
James Lloyd (1769–1831)	College 1787		
Henry Cabot Lodge (1850–1924)	College 1871; Law 1874; PhD 1876	President pro tempore of the United States Senate	
Henry Cabot Lodge Jr. (1902–1985)	College 1924	1960 Republican U.S. vice presidential nominee	
Gilman Marston (1811–1890)	Law 1840		
Spark Matsunaga (1916–1990)	Law 1951		
Martha McSally (born 1966)	Kennedy 1990		
Prentiss Mellen (1764–1840)	College 1784		
Amos Nourse (1794–1877)	College 1812, PhD. 1817		
Harrison Gray Otis (1765–1848)	Law 1765		
Elijah Paine (1757–1842)	College 1781		
Samuel Pasco (1834–1917)	College 1858		
Boies Penrose (1860–1921)	Law 1881		
Claude Pepper (1900–1989)	Law 1924	U.S. congressman	
Timothy Pickering (1745–1829)	College 1763		
Larry Pressler (born 1942)	HKS 1971; Law 1971		
William Proxmire (1915–2005)	Business 1940; HKS 1949		
Robert Rantoul Jr. (1805–1852)	College 1826		
Jack Reed (born 1949)	HKS 1973; Law 1982		
Jay Rockefeller (1937–2026)	College 1961		
Mitt Romney (born 1947)	JD-MBA 1975		
William Roth (1921–2003)	Business 1947; Law 1949		
Frederic M. Sackett (1868–1941)	Law 1893		
Leverett Saltonstall (1892–1979)	College 1914; Law 1917		
Paul Sarbanes (1933–2020)	Law 1960		
Ben Sasse (born 1972)	College 1994		
Frederick A. Sawyer (1822–1891)	College 1844		
Harrison Schmitt (born 1935)	PhD 1964	Astronaut	
Charles Schumer (born 1950)	College 1971; Law 1974		
James Sheafe (1755–1829)	College 1774		
William Paine Sheffield Sr. (1820–1907)	College 1774		
Benjamin Smith II (1916–1991)	College 1939		
Peleg Sprague (1793–1880)	College 1812		
Ted Stevens (1923–2010)	Law 1950	President pro tempore of the United States Senate	
Adlai Stevenson III (1930–2021)	College 1952; Law 1957		
Richard Stone (1928–2019)	College 1949		
Dan Sullivan (born 1964)	College 1987		
Charles Sumner (1811–1874)	College 1830; Law 1833		
John E. Sununu (born 1964)	Business 1991		
Kingsley A. Taft (1903–1970)	Law 1928		
Robert Taft Jr. (1917–1993)	Law 1942		
Robert A. Taft (1889–1953)	Law 1913		
Thomas W. Thompson (1766–1821)	College 1786		
Pat Toomey (born 1961)	College 1984		
Robert Torricelli (born 1951)	HKS 1980		
Jonathan Trumbull (1710–1785)	College 1727		
Paul Tsongas (1941–1997)	HKS 1974		
David Vitter (born 1961)	College 1983		
Mark Warner (born 1954)	Law 1980	Governor of Virginia, co-founder of Nextel	
Elizabeth Warren (born 1949)	Professor of Law	2020 presidential election candidate	
Sinclair Weeks (1893–1972)	College 1914		
Paine Wingate (1739–1838)	College 1759		
Robert Charles Winthrop (1809–1894)	College 1828		
Tim Wirth (born 1939)	College 1961; Education 1964		
Thomas A. Wofford (1908–1978)	Law 1931		
Edward O. Wolcott (1848–1905)	Law 1875		
Louis Wyman (1917–2002)	Law 1941		

== U.S. representatives ==
Name	Class year	Notability	Reference(s)
Charles Francis Adams Sr. (1807–1886)	College 1825		
George E. Adams (1840–1917)	College 1860		
John Adler (1959–2011)	College 1981; Law 1984		
Richard S. Aldrich (1884–1941)	Law 1909		
Joseph Allen (1749–1827)	College 1774		
Tom Allen (born 1945)	Law 1974		
Fisher Ames (1758–1808)	College 1774		
John B. Anderson (1922–2017)	Law 1949	U.S. presidential candidate, U.S. representative	
A. Piatt Andrew (1873–1936)	GSAS 1895		
John F. Andrew (1850–1895)	College 1872		
John Ashbrook (1928–1982)	College 1952	U.S. presidential candidate, U.S. representative	
Charles Humphrey Atherton (1773–1853)	College 1794		
Jake Auchincloss (born 1988)	College 2010		
Robert L. Bacon (1884–1938)	College 1907		
Charles Montague Bakewell (1867–1957)	GSAS 1894		
Joseph C. Baldwin (1897–1957)	College 1920		
John Goff Ballentine (1825–1915)	Law 1848		
David Barker Jr. (1797–1834)	College 1815		
John Barrow (born 1955)	Law 1979		
Samuel J. Barrows (1845–1909)	Divinity 1871		
Franklin Bartlett (1847–1909)	College 1869		
Perkins Bass (1912–2011)	Law 1938		
William H. Bates (1917–1969)	Business 1947		
Anthony Beilenson (1932–2017)	College 1954; Law 1957		
Perry Belmont (1851–1947)	College 1872		
Doug Bereuter (born 1939)	Design 1966; HKS 1973		
Horace Binney (1780–1875)	College 1797		
Chester C. Bolton (1882–1939)	College 1905		
Oliver P. Bolton (1917–1972)	College 1939		
Benjamin Bourne (1755–1808)	College 1775		
Shearjashub Bourne (1746–1806)	College 1764		
Henry Sherman Boutell (1856–1926)	College 1876		
David R. Bowen (born 1932)	College 1954		
Selwyn Z. Bowman (1840–1928)	College 1860		
Brendan F. Boyle (born 1977)	HKS 2005		
George Bradbury (1770–1823)	College 1789		
Theophilus Bradbury (1739–1803)	College 1757		
John Brademas (1927–2016)	College 1949	U.S. House majority whip	
Vincent M. Brennan (1890–1959)	Law 1912		
Frederick George Bromberg (1837–1930)	College 1858		
James E. Bromwell (1920–2009)	Business 1947		
George M. Brooks (1824–1893)	College 1844		
Anthony Brown (born 1961)	College 1984		
Bud Brown (1927–2022)	Business 1949		
Lathrop Brown (1883–1959)	College 1903		
Clement Laird Brumbaugh (1863–1921)	College 1894		
Frank H. Buck (1887–1942)	Law 1911		
Melville Bull (1854–1909)	College 1877		
Henry Adams Bullard (1788–1851)	College 1807		
Anson Burlingame (1820–1870)	Law 1846		
Daniel Dee Burnes (1851–1899)	Law 1874		
James N. Burnes (1827–1889)	Law 1853		
Edward Burnett (1849–1925)	College 1871		
Josiah Butler (1779–1854)	College 1803		
Tom Campbell (born 1952)	Law 1976		
Bruce F. Caputo (born 1943)	College 1965		
Joaquin Castro (born 1974)	Law 2000		
Theron Ephron Catlin (1878–1960)	College 1899		
John Curtis Chamberlain (1772–1834)	College 1793		
Alfred C. Chapin (1848–1936)	Law 1871		
Robert B. Chiperfield (1899–1971)	College 1922		
William M. Citron (1896–1976)	Law 1921		
Henry Alden Clark (1850–1944)	College 1874		
John Bullock Clark Jr. (1831–1903)	Law 1854		
Katherine Clark (born 1963)	HKS 1997		
Curt Clawson (born 1959)	Business 1980		
Joseph W. Clift (1837–1908)	Medical 1862		
David Cobb (1748–1830)	College 1766		
William Cogswell (1838–1895)	Law 1860		
Joshua Coit (1758–1798)	College 1776		
James M. Collins (1916–1989)	Business 1943		
Patrick Collins (1844–1905)	Law 1871		
John Bertrand Conlan (1930–2021)	Law 1954		
Gerry Connolly (born 1950)	HKS 1979		
Merrill Cook (born 1946)	Business 1971		
Jim Cooper (born 1954)	Law 1980		
Sam Coppersmith (born 1955)	College 1976		
Tom Cotton (born 1977)	College 1999, Law 2002		
Clarence Dennis Coughlin (1883–1946)	College 1906		
Lawrence Coughlin (1929–2001)	Business 1954		
Christopher Cox (born 1952)	Business 1977; Law 1977	U.S. Securities and Exchange Commission chairman, U.S. representative	
James K. Coyne, III (born 1946)	Business 1970		
William C. Cramer (1922–2003)	Law 1948		
Dan Crenshaw (born 1984)	Kennedy 2018		
Paul Cronin (1938–1997)	HKS 1969		
Frank Crowther (1870–1955)	Dental 1898		
Jabez Lamar Monroe Curry (1825–1903)	Law 1845		
Laurence Curtis (1893–1989)	College 1916		
Joshua Cushman (1761–1834)	College 1787		
Richard Cutts (1771–1845)	College 1790		
Frederick W. Dallinger (1871–1955)	College 1893		
Joseph Dane (1778–1858)	College 1799		
Henry G. Danforth (1854–1918)	College 1877		
Samuel Arza Davenport (1834–1911)	Law 1855		
Artur Davis (born 1967)	College 1990; Law 1993		
George T. Davis (1810–1877)	College 1829		
Horace Davis (1831–1916)	College 1849		
Jacob E. Davis (1905–2003)	Law 1930		
Robert T. Davis (1823–1906)	Medical 1847		
John Dawson (1762–1814)	College 1782		
Frederick Simpson Deitrick (1875–1948)	Law 1898		
Antonio Delgado (born 1977)	Law 2005		
Henry C. Deming (1815–1872)	College 1839		
David W. Dennis (1912–1999)	Law 1936		
Winfield K. Denton (1896–1971)	Law 1922		
Ron DeSantis (born 1978)	Law 2005		
Albert Douglas (1852–1935)	Law 1874		
John G. Dow (1905–2003)	College 1927		
James P.B. Duffy (1878–1969)	Law 1904		
James H. Duncan (1793–1869)	College 1812		
Edwin Russell Durno (1899–1976)	Medical 1927		
Chet Edwards (born 1951)	Business 1981		
Samuel Atkins Eliot (1798–1862)	College 1817		
Thomas H. Eliot (1907–1991)	College 1928		
Caleb Ellis (1767–1816)	College 1793		
Arlen Erdahl (1931–2023)	KSG 1966		
Elizabeth Esty (born 1959)	College 1981		
George Eustis Jr. (1828–1872)	Law 1848		
William Everett (1839–1910)	College 1859		
Paul Fearing (1762–1822)	College 1785		
Michael A. Feighan (1905–1992)	Law 1931		
Randy Fine (1974–)	College 1996, MBA 1998		
Hamilton Fish III (1888–1991)	College 1910		
Hamilton Fish IV (1926–1996)	College 1949		
Joseph L. Fisher (1914–1992)	GSAS 1947		
Frederick G. Fleetwood (1868–1938)	College 1891		
George Edmund Foss (1863–1936)	College 1885		
Abiel Foster (1735–1806)	College 1756		
Bill Foster (born 1955)	PhD 1983		
George B. Francis (1883–1967)	Law 1907		
Barney Frank (1940–2026)	College 1962; Law 1977		
Nathan Frank (1852–1931)	Law 1871		
Nathaniel Freeman Jr. (1766–1800)	College 1787		
Richard P. Freeman (1869–1944)	College 1891		
Louis A. Frothingham (1871–1928)	College 1893		
James G. Fulton (1903–1971)	Law 1927		
James A. Gallivan (1866–1928)	College 1888		
Barzillai Gannett (1764–1832)	College 1785		
John Ganson (1818–1874)	College 1839		
John Garamendi (born 1945)	Business 1970		
Augustus Peabody Gardner (1865–1918)	College 1886		
Francis Gardner (1771–1835)	College 1793		
Frederick Gillett (1851–1935)	Law 1877	Speaker of the United States House of Representatives	
Charles J. Gilman (1824–1901)	Law 1850		
Jimmy Gomez (born 1974)	KSG 2002		
William Gordon (1763–1802)	College 1779		
Benjamin Gorham (1775–1855)	College 1795		
Josh Gottheimer (born 1975)	Law 2004		
Bill Gradison (born 1928)	Business 1951		
Fred Grandy (born 1948)	College 1970	Actor, U.S. representative	
Alan Grayson (born 1958)	College 1978; HKS 1983; Law 1983	Actor, U.S. representative	
Isaiah L. Green (1761–1841)	College 1781		
S. William Green (1929–2002)	College 1950		
Willard Hall (1780–1875)	College 1799		
Josh Harder (born 1986)	Business/Kennedy 2014		
Jane Harman (born 1945)	Law 1969		
Michael J. Harrington (born 1936)	College 1958		
Benjamin W. Harris (1823–1907)	Law 1849		
Katherine Harris (born 1957)	HKS 1997	Florida secretary of state during the 2000 U.S. presidential election recount	
Robert O. Harris (1854–1926)	College 1877		
Frank G. Harrison (1940–2009)	Law 1964		
Julian Hartridge (1829–1879)	Law 1850		
Seth Hastings (1762–1831)	College 1782		
William Soden Hastings (1798–1842)	College 1817		
Nathaniel Appleton Haven (1762–1831)	College 1779		
Edward D. Hayden (1833–1908)	College 1854		
Pablo Hernández Rivera (born 1991)	College 2013		
John W. Heselton (1900–1962)	Law		
Brian Higgins (born 1959)	HKS 1996		
John Patrick Higgins (1893–1955)	College 1917		
John Boynton Philip Clayton Hill (1879–1941)	Law 1903		
Jim Himes (born 1966)	College 1988		
Rockwood Hoar (1855–1906)	College 1876		
Samuel Hoar (1778–1856)	College 1802		
Sherman Hoar (1860–1898)	College 1882		
John B. Hollister (1890–1979)	Law 1915		
Elizabeth Holtzman (born 1941)	Radcliffe 1962; Law 1965	District attorney, New York comptroller	
Charles E. Hooker (1825–1914)	Law 1846		
Steve Horn (1931–2011)	HKS 1955		
Alanson B. Houghton (1863–1941)	College 1886		
Amo Houghton (1926–2020)	College 1950; Business 1952		
L. Paul Howland (1865–1942)	Law 1890		
Michael Huffington (born 1947)	Business 1971	Businessman and ex-husband of Arianna Huffington	
John W. Hulbert (1770–1831)	College 1795		
Morton D. Hull (1867–1937)	College 1892		
William L. Hungate (1922–2007)	Law 1948		
Carleton Hunt (1836–1921)	College 1856		
John Jarman (1915–1982)	Law 1941		
Leonard Jarvis (1781–1854)	College 1800		
William J. Jefferson (born 1947)	Law 1972		
Albert G. Jenkins (1830–1864)	Law 1850		
Nancy Johnson (born 1935)	Radcliffe 1957		
Thomas Laurens Jones (1819–1887)	Law 1846		
Robert Kean (1893–1980)	College 1915		
Joseph G. Kendall (1788–1847)	Law 1810		
Joseph P. Kennedy III (born 1980)	Law 2009		
Barbara Kennelly (born 1936)	Business 1959		
John Bozman Kerr (1809–1878)	College 1830		
Kevin Kiley (born 1985)	College 2007		
Ron Kind (born 1963)	College 1985		
Daniel P. King (1801–1850)	College 1823		
James G. King (1791–1853)	College 1810		
Martin Kinsley (1754–1835)	College 1778		
Herb Klein (1930–2023)	Law 1953		
Samuel Knox (1815–1905)	Law 1838		
Ken Kramer (born 1942)	Law 1966		
Raja Krishnamoorthi (born 1973)	Law 2000		
John C. Kunkel (1898–1970)	Law 1926		
Peter Kyros (1925–2012)	College 1957		
Greg Landsman (born 1976)	Divinity 2004		
Jim Langevin (born 1964)	HKS 1994		
Henderson Lovelace Lanham (1888–1957)	GSAS 1912		
John LeBoutillier (born 1953)	College 1976		
Silas Lee (1760–1814)	College 1784		
George Leonard (1729–1819)	College 1748		
John E. Leonard (1845–1878)	College 1863		
Andy Levin (born 1960)	Law 1994		
Sander Levin (born 1931)	Law 1957		
Mel Levine (born 1943)	Law 1969		
Lawrence Lewis (1879–1943)	College 1901		
Lucius Littauer (1859–1944)	College 1878		
John Locke (1764–1855)	College 1792		
Stephen Longfellow (1776–1849)	College 1798		
Nicholas Longworth (1869–1931)	College 1891	Speaker of the United States House of Representatives	
George B. Loring (1817–1891)	College 1838		
Theodore Lyman (1833–1897)	College 1855		
Stephen Lynch (born 1955)	HKS 1999		
William Pitt Lynde (1817–1885)	Law 1841		
Torbert Macdonald (1917–1976)	College 1940		
W. Kingsland Macy (1889–1961)	College 1912		
Dan Maffei (born 1968)	HKS 1995		
Walter W. Magee (1861–1927)	College 1889		
Andrew Maguire (born 1939)	KSG 1966		
Rowland B. Mahany (1864–1937)	College 1884		
James H. Maloney (born 1948)	College 1972		
David S. Mann (born 1939)	College 1961		
Brian Mast (born 1980)	Extension 2016		
Jim Matheson (born 1960)	College 1982		
Wiley Mayne (1917–2007)	College 1938		
Romano L. Mazzoli (1932–2022)	KSG 2004		
Washington J. McCormick (1884–1949)	College 1906		
Walter I. McCoy (1859–1933)	College 1882		
Martha McSally (born 1966)	HKS 1990		
Ward Miller (1902–1984)	College 1931		
Wilbur Mills (1909–1992)	Law 1933		
Walt Minnick (born 1942)	Law 1969		
Nahum Mitchell (1769–1853)	College 1789		
Thomas R. Mitchell (1783–1837)	College 1802		
John S. Monagan (1911–2005)	Law 1937		
Jim Moody (1935–2019)	HKS 1967		
John Moolenaar (born 1961)	KSG 1989		
William S. Moorhead (1923–1987)	Law 1949		
Edward Joy Morris (1815–1881)	College 1836		
Isaac Edward Morse (1809–1866)	College 1829		
Harold G. Mosier (1889–1971)	Law 1915		
Luther W. Mott (1874–1923)	College 1896		
Seth Moulton (born 1978)	College 2001, HBS-HKS 2011		
Scott Murphy (born 1970)	College 1992		
Henry F. Naphen (1852–1905)	College 1878		
Charles P. Nelson (1907–1962)	Law 1931		
James Ellsworth Noland (1920–1992)	Business 1943		
Joseph F. O'Connell (1872–1942)	Law 1896		
John J. O'Connor (1885–1960)	Law 1911		
Gayton P. Osgood (1797–1861)	College 1815		
Richard Ottinger (1929–2026)	Law 1953		
George E. Outland (1906–1981)	GSAS 1929		
Allen Ferdinand Owen (1816–1865)	Law 1839		
John G. Palfrey (1796–1881)	College 1815		
Chris Pappas (born 1980)	College 2002		
Isaac Parker (1768–1830)	College 1786		
Gorham Parks (1794–1877)	College 1813		
George Partridge (1740–1828)	College 1762		
John Perkins Jr. (1819–1885)	Law 1842		
William H. Perry (1839–1902)	College 1859		
Andrew James Peters (1872–1938)	College 1895, Law 1898		
Tom Petri (born 1940)	College 1962; Law 1965		
Michael Francis Phelan (1875–1941)	College 1897		
Philip J. Philbin (1898–1972)	College 1920		
Stephen C. Phillips (1801–1857)	College 1819		
William Alvin Pittenger (1885–1951)	Law 1912		
Edmund Platt (1865–1939)	College 1888		
William Plumer Jr. (1789–1854)	College 1809		
Bruce Poliquin (born 1953)	College 1976		
Charles O. Porter (1919–2006)	College 1941		
Katie Porter (born 1974)	Law 2001		
Elisha R. Potter (1811–1882)	College 1830		
Henry Otis Pratt (1838–1931)	College 1862		
William Preston (1816–1887)	Law 1838		
L. Richardson Preyer (1919–2001)	Law 1949		
Josiah Quincy III (1772–1864)	College 1790		
Jamie Raskin (born 1962)	College 1983, Law 1987		
John H. Ray (1886–1975)	Law 1911		
Nathan Read (1759–1849)	College 1781		
Ben Reifel (1906–1990)	KSG 1949		
Henry S. Reuss (1912–2002)	Law 1936		
Mel Reynolds (born 1952)	KSG 1986		
John Jacob Rhodes (1916–2003)	Law 1941		
Thomas Rice (1768–1854)	College 1793		
William M. Richardson (1774–1838)	College 1797		
Francis W. Rockwell (1844–1929)	Law 1871		
John Jacob Rogers (1881–1925)	College 1904		
Edward G. Rohrbough (1874–1956)	GSAS 1906		
James Roosevelt (1907–1991)	College 1930		
Nathaniel Ruggles (1761–1819)	College 1781		
Raul Ruiz (born 1972)	HKS 2001, Medical 2001		
Richard M. Russell (1891–1977)	College 1914		
Leverett Saltonstall I (1783–1845)	College 1802		
John Sarbanes (born 1962)	Law 1988		
James H. Scheuer (1920–2005)	Business 1943		
Adam Schiff (born 1960)	Law 1985		
Pat Schroeder (1940–2023)	Law 1964		
Bobby Scott (born 1947)	College 1969		
Ebenezer Seaver (1763–1844)	College 1784		
John F. Seiberling (1918–2008)	College 1941		
Joe Sestak (born 1951)	HKS 1980; PhD 1984		
Samuel Sewall (1757–1812)	College 1776		
Terri Sewell (born 1965)	Law 1992		
Bob Shamansky (1927–2011)	Law 1950		
Brad Sherman (born 1954)	Law 1979		
Rob Simmons (born 1943)	HKS 1979		
John Simpkins (1862–1898)	College 1885		
Kenneth F. Simpson (1895–1941)	Law 1922		
Josiah Smith (1738–1803)	College 1774		
Peter Plympton Smith (born 1945)	Education 1970		
William Henry Sowden (1840–1907)	Law 1865		
Ambrose Spencer (1765–1848)	College 1783		
Charles F. Sprague (1857–1902)	College 1879		
William H. Stafford (1869–1957)	Law 1893		
Harley O. Staggers Jr. (born 1951)	College 1974		
James V. Stanton (1932–2022)	AMP 1984		
Asahel Stearns (1774–1839)	College 1797		
Foster Waterman Stearns (1881–1956)	GSAS 1906		
William Stedman (1765–1831)	College 1784		
Elise Stefanik (born 1984)	College 2006		
George R. Stobbs (1877–1966)	College 1899		
Eben F. Stone (1822–1895)	College 1843		
Bellamy Storer (1847–1922)	College 1867		
Samuel S. Stratton (1916–1990)	A.M. 1940		
George Sullivan (1771–1838)	College 1790		
Lorenzo De Medici Sweat (1818–1898)	Law 1840		
William Irvin Swoope (1862–1930)	Law 1886		
Mark Takano (born 1960)	College 1983		
John J. Taylor (1808–1892)	College 1829		
Nelson Taylor (1821–1894)	Law 1860		
Scott Taylor (born 1979)	Extension 2014		
Van Taylor (born 1972)	College 1995, Business 2001		
Frank Tejeda (1945–1997)	HKS 1980		
Samuel Tenney (1748–1816)	College 1772		
George Thatcher (1754–1824)	College 1776		
Samuel Thatcher (1776–1872)	College 1793		
Thomas Chandler Thacher (1858–1945)	College 1882		
John A. Thayer (1857–1917)	College 1879		
George H. Tinkham (1870–1956)	College 1894		
Pat Toomey (born 1961)	College 1984	Club for Growth president	
Peter Torkildsen (born 1958)	HKS 1990		
Jonathan Trumbull Jr. (1740–1809)	College 1759	Speaker of the United States House of Representatives	
Charles Wentworth Upham (1802–1875)	Divinity 1821		
George B. Upham (1768–1848)	College 1789		
Jabez Upham (1764–1811)	College 1785		
Chris Van Hollen (born 1959)	HKS 1985		
Stephen Van Rensselaer (1764–1839)	College 1782		
Richard Vander Veen (1922–2006)	Law 1949		
Juan Vargas (born 1961)	Law 1991		
John Varnum (1778–1836)	College 1798		
Victor Veysey (1915–2001)	Business 1938		
Roger Vose (1763–1841)	College 1790		
Peleg Wadsworth (1748–1829)	College 1769		
Robert Jarvis Cochran Walker (1838–1903)	Law 1858		
Samuel H. Walley (1805–1877)	College 1826		
Artemas Ward (1727–1800)	College 1748		
Artemas Ward Jr. (1762–1847)	College 1783		
Samuel L. Warner (1828–1893)	Law 1854		
Vespasian Warner (1842–1925)	Law 1868		
William W. Warren (1834–1880)	College 1855		
Charles G. Washburn (1857–1928)	College 1880		
Steve Watkins (born 1976)	Kennedy 2017		
Laurence Hawley Watres (1882–1964)	Law 1907		
Archibald J. Weaver (1843–1887)	Law 1869		
Ed Weber (1931–2023)	Law 1956		
Charles W. Whalen Jr. (1920–2011)	Business 1946		
Laban Wheaton (1754–1846)	College 1774		
Leonard White (1767–1849)	College 1787		
William Whiting (1813–1873)	College 1833		
Richard B. Wigglesworth (1891–1960)	College 1912		
Scott Wike (1834–1901)	Law 1859		
Lemuel Williams (1747–1828)	College 1765		
James Wilson I (1766–1839)	College 1789		
John Wilson (1777–1848)	College 1799		
Samuel Winslow (1862–1940)	College 1885		
Robert Winthrop (1809–1894)	College 1828	Speaker of the United States House of Representatives	
Samuel T. Worcester (1804–1882)	College 1830		
John W. Wydler (1924–1987)	Law 1950		
Chalmers Wylie (1920–1998)	Law 1948		
Clarence Clifton Young (1922–2016)	Law 1949		

== Other political figures ==
Name	Class year	Notability	Reference(s)
Michael G. Adams (born 1976)	Law	Secretary of state of the Commonwealth of Kentucky	
Mahidol Adulyadej, Prince of Songkla (1892–1929)	Certificate in Public Health 1921, M.D. 1927	Member of the House of Chakri, of Siam (Thailand); son of King Chulalongkorn of Siam; father of King Ananda Mahidol (Rama VIII) and King Bhumibol Adulyadej (Rama IX) of Thailand; regarded as the father of modern medicine and public health of Thailand	
Rizwan Ahmed	HKS	Senior Pakistani civil servant	
Shpend Ahmeti (born 1978)	2004; HKS Public Administration	Mayor of Prishtina	
Reg Alcock (1948–2011)	KSG	Member of House of Commons of Canada	
Tabata Amaral (born 1993)	College 2016	Member of the Chamber of Deputies of Brazil	
Ray Atherton (1883–1960)	College 1905	First U.S. ambassador to Canada	
Lalith Athulathmudali (1936–1993)	Law	Sri Lankan minister of National Security, minister of Education	
Pierre Baillargeon (1812–1891)	Medical	Member of Senate of Canada	
Tariq Bajwa	HKS	Governor of the State Bank of Pakistan	
Kostas Bakoyiannis (born 1978)	MPA	Former mayor of Athens	
William Barnes Jr. (1866–1930)	Harvard College (1888)	Chairman of the New York Republican State Committee, member of the Republican National Committee	
Jocelyn Benson (born 1977)	J.D.	Michigan secretary of state	
Sandy Berger (1945–2015)	Law 1971	U.S. National Security advisor	
Ben Bernanke	College 1975	Chair of the Federal Reserve	
Alan Bersin (born 1946)	BA	Commissioner of U.S. Customs and Border Protection	
James Berry	Law	Member of British Parliament	
Murtaza Bhutto (1954–1996)	B.A	Former chairman of the Pakistan Peoples Party (Shaheed Bhutto)	
Julie Bishop (born 1956)	Business, 1996	Australian minister for Foreign Affairs	
Julia Chang Bloch	Government, Grad School 1967	U.S. ambassador to Nepal (under President George H. W. Bush), first U.S. ambassador of Asian origin	
Michael Bloomberg (born 1942)	Business 1966	Mayor of New York City	
André Boisclair (born 1966)	HKS 2005	Former leader of Parti Québécois	
Nick Boles (born 1965)	HKS	Member of British Parliament	
Frederick William Borden (1847–1917)	Medical 1868	Member of House of Commons of Canada	
Alvin Bragg (born 1973)	College 1995; Law 1995	New York County district attorney, first to secure a conviction of a former U.S. president	
Miguel Braun (born 1973)	Master and Ph.D. in Economics 2001	Secretary of commerce (2015–2018) and secretary of economic policy (2018–2019) of Argentina	
L. Paul Bremer (born 1941)	Business 1966	Ambassador	
Zbigniew Brzezinski (1928–2017)	PhD 1953	U.S. National Security advisor	
Liam Byrne (born 1970)	Business	Member of British Parliament	
Anna Escobedo Cabral (born 1959)	HKS 1990	Treasurer of the United States	
Pat Caddell	College 1972	Pollster	
Barry Campbell (born 1950)	Law 1977	Member of House of Commons of Canada	
Pedro Albizu Campos (1891–1965)	PhD; 1921	President of the Puerto Rican Nationalist Party; led the Puerto Rican Nationalist Party Revolts of the 1950s	
Frank T. Caprio (born 1966)	College 1988	General treasurer of Rhode Island	
Princess Maria Carolina Christina of Bourbon-Parma, Duchess of Guernica and Marchioness of Sala (born 1974)		Member of the Royal and Ducal House of Bourbon-Parma and Dutch royal family; fourth and youngest child of Princess Irene of the Netherlands and Carlos Hugo, Duke of Parma	
René Castro (born 1957)	MPA, PHD	FAO assistant director general of Climate, Biodiversity, Land and Water Department	
Robert Cerasoli (born 1945)	HKS 1988	Massachusetts House of Representatives, inspector general of Commonwealth of Massachusetts andNew Orleans	
Sun Chanthol (born 1956)	Master's in Public Administration	Cambodian minister of public works and transport	
P. Chidambaram	HBS	Finance minister of India	
Clara Chou (born 1953)	Master of Public Administration 1987	Taiwanese journalist, television and radio personality	
Newton Ramsay Colter (1844–1917)	Medical 1867	Member of House of Commons of Canada	
John Cooper (born 1956)	College	Mayor of Nashville	
Ross Cranston (born 1948)	Law 1973	Member of British Parliament	
Tom Daly (born 1954)	College 1976	California state assemblyman, former mayor of Anaheim, California	
David Davis (born 1948)	Business 1985	British politician	
Nelson Antonio Denis	College 1977	Former New York state assemblyman	
Louis-Léon Lesieur Desaulniers (1823–1896)	College 1846	Member of House of Commons of Canada	
W. E. B. Du Bois (1868–1963)	College 1890; A.M. 1891; PhD 1895	Civil rights leader, African American studies scholar	
Ralph Earle II	B.S. History 1950	Chief negotiator of the SALT II arms control agreement	
Lucie Edwards	HKS 1984	Canadian diplomat	
William Ellery (1727–1780)	College 1747	Signer of United States Declaration of Independence	
Daniel Ellsberg (1931–2023)	College 1952; PhD 1963	Leaker of the Pentagon Papers	
John English (born 1945)	Ph.D 1973	Member of House of Commons of Canada	
Douglas Feith (born 1953)	College 1975	U.S. under secretary of defense for policy	
Andy Fillmore (born 1966)	GSD 1995	Mayor of Halifax, Nova Scotia, Canada	
Dudley Fishburn (born 1946)	College	Member of British Parliament	
Michèle Flournoy (born 1960)	College 1983	U.S. under secretary of defense for policy	
Nigel Forman (born 1943)	HKS	Member of British Parliament	
Chrystia Freeland (born 1968)	College	Former deputy prime minister of Canada	
Richard Fuller		British member of Parliament	
Kate Gallego (born 1981)	College 2004	Mayor of Phoenix	
José Manuel García-Margallo y Marfil (born 1944)	LLM (1972)	Former minister of Foreign Affairs of the Kingdom of Spain and former member of the European Parliament	
David Gergen (born 1942)	Law 1967	Advisor to four U.S. presidents	
Carl Gershman (born 1943)	M. Education 1968	U.N. representative and National Endowment for Democracy president	
Herman Goldner (1916–2010)	MBA, c. 1947	Mayor of St. Petersburg, Florida, 1961–67, 1971–73	
Richard N. Goodwin (1931–2018)	Law 1958	Speechwriter for Kennedy and Johnson administrations; author	
Jennifer Gordon	College 1987, Law 1992	Founded the Workplace Project; associate professor at Fordham University School of Law	
Jamie Gorelick (born 1950)	College 1972; Law 1975	Member of 9/11 Commission	
Barbara Greene (born 1945)	KSG	Member of House of Commons of Canada	
John Hagelin (born 1954)	PhD 1981	Third-party presidential candidate	
Charles Sumner Hamlin (1861–1938)	College 1886	Chair of the Federal Reserve	
Will Ford Hartnett (born 1956)	College 1978	Lawyer from Dallas; member of the Texas House of Representatives	
Howard E. Haugerud		Diplomat	
Kerry Healey (born 1960)	College 1982	Lieutenant governor of Massachusetts	
James M. Henderson (1921–1995)	Advanced Management Program, date missing	Founder of top-ranked Henderson Advertising Agency of Greenville, South Carolina; Republican candidate for lieutenant governor of South Carolina in 1970	
Paul Heroux (born 1976)	MPA 2011	State representative from Massachusetts	
Thomas Wentworth Higginson (1823–1911)	College 1841	Author, abolitionist, colonel	
Alger Hiss (1904–1996)	Law 1929	Accused of espionage on behalf of the Soviet Union	
Tom Hockin (born 1938)	KSG	Member of House of Commons of Canada	
William Hooper (1742–1790)	College 1760	Signer of United States Declaration of Independence	
Ken Hughes (born 1954)	KSG 1983	Member of House of Commons of Canada	
Rafael Hui (born 1948)	HKS 1983	Chief secretary for administration of Hong Kong	
Michael Ignatieff (born 1947)	PhD History 1976	Liberal Party of Canada leader of Her Majesty's loyal opposition, member of Parliament, scholar, professor, author	
Mohamad Al Ississ	College BA 2000, GSAS MA 2000, HKS MPAID 2007, HKS/GSAS PhD 2010	Jordanian minister of Finance	
Greville Janner (1928–2015)	Law	Member, House of Lords	
William Jeffrey	PhD	13th director, National Institute of Standards and Technology	
Pauline Jewett (1922–1992)	Ph.D 1949	Member of House of Commons of Canada	
Eric Johnson (born 1975)	College 1998	Mayor of Dallas	
Abraham Katz (1938–2010)	PhD	Ambassador of the United States to the Organisation for Economic Co-operation and Development	
Henry Kaulback (1830–1896)	College	Member of Senate of Canada	
Raymond W. Kelly (born 1940)	HKS 1984	New York City police commissioner	
Caroline Kennedy (born 1957)	Radcliffe 1980	Writer; daughter of John F. Kennedy; former U.S. ambassador to Japan	
Joseph P. Kennedy (1888–1969)	College 1912	Kennedy political family patriarch	
Max Kennedy Jr. (born 1993)	College 2016	Political organizer, volunteer, whistleblower	
Alan Keyes (born 1950)	College 1972; PhD 1979	U.S. presidential candidate and senatorial candidate	
Marc Kielburger (born 1977)	College 1999	Canadian humanitarian and activist	
Saritha Komatireddy (born 1984 or 1985)	College 2005; Law 2009	Federal prosecutor, chief of staff of the Drug Enforcement Administration, and Republican nominee for attorney general of New York in the 2026 election	
Faik Konitza (1875–1942)		Writer, ambassador of Albania to the U.S.	
Philip Lader	Law	U.S. ambassador to the United Kingdom	
Anthony Lake (born 1939)	College 1961	U.S. National Security advisor	
David Lammy (born 1972)	Law 1994	Former Deputy Prime Minister of the United Kingdom, Former Secretary of State for Foreign, Commonwealth and Development Affairs of the United Kingdom, and Member of British Parliament	
Corliss Lamont (1905–1995)	College 1924, professor	ACLU director, humanist author	
Maurice Lamontagne (1917–1983)	M.A.	Member of Senate of Canada	
Horacio Rodríguez Larreta (born 1965)	Business 1993	Mayor of Buenos Aires	
Allan Leal (1917–1999)	Law 1957	President of the Empire Club of Canada; dean of Osgoode Hall Law School	
Tobias Lear (1762–1816)	College 1783	George Washington's personal secretary	
Dominic LeBlanc (born 1967)	Law	Member of House of Commons of Canada	
Lee Jun-seok (born 1985)	B.A	Former leader of the People Power Party of South Korea	
Alfred Lefurgey (1871–1934)	Law 1894	Member of House of Commons of Canada	
Charles Lemmond (1929–2012)	A.B. 1952	Pennsylvania state senator	
Lin Yi-hsiung (born 1941)	Master of Public Administration 1987	Former chairman of the Taiwan's Democratic Progressive Party	
Lawrence B. Lindsey (born 1954)	A.M. 1981; PhD 1985	Economist, director of the National Economic Council	
Liu He (born 1952)	MPA	Former vice premier of the State Council of the People's Republic of China	
Leopoldo López (born 1971)	Master of Public Policy in HKS 1996	Venezuelan former mayor of Chacao and leader of Popular Will	
Ruthzee Louijeune (born 1987)	JD and MPA 2014	President of the Boston City Council	
Donald Stovel Macdonald (1932–2018)	Law	Member of House of Commons of Canada	
Roderick MacFarquhar (1930–2019)	College 1955	Member of British Parliament	
Roy MacLaren (born 1934)	AMP 1973	Member of House of Commons of Canada	
Cyrus Macmillan (1882–1953)	Ph.D 1909	Member of House of Commons of Canada	
Tim Mahoney (born 1949)	MHA 2005	Mayor of Fargo, North Dakota	
Nabiel Makarim (born 1945)	HKS 1984	Indonesian environmental minister	
Michael Marshall (1930–2006)	Business 1960	Member of British Parliament	
Crown Princess Masako of Japan (born 1963)	B.A.	Consort of Crown Prince Naruhito, first son of Emperor Akihito and Empress Michiko; member of the Imperial House of Japan through marriage	
Timothy Massad (born 1956)	College 1978; Law 1984	Corporate lawyer at Cravath, Swaine & Moore, U.S. assistant secretary of the Treasury for Financial Stability, nominee to chair the Commodity Futures Trading Commission	
Dan Massey (1942–2013)	Graduate 1969	Sexual freedom scholar, religious philosopher, human rights activist, chief engineer at BBN Technologies, and senior scientist at Science Applications International Corporation	
Robert Charles Matthews (1871–1952)	College 1902	Member of House of Commons of Canada	
Allan McAvity (1882–1944)	College	Member of House of Commons of Canada	
Susan McCaw (born 1962)	Business 1988	U.S. ambassador to Austria, 2005–07	
Dan McCready (born 1983)	Business 2011	Entrepreneur, candidate for U.S. House of Representatives in North Carolina	
Ezekiel McLeod (1840–1920)	Law 1867	Member of House of Commons of Canada	
Ken Mehlman (born 1967)	Law 1991	Former chairman of the Republican National Committee	
David Miller (born 1958)	Economics (undergrad) 1981	Mayor of Toronto	
William Green Miller		U.S. ambassador to Ukraine 1993–1998	
Rhodri Morgan (1939–2017)	HKS	First minister of Wales 2000–2009	
Daniel Mudd (born 1956)	HKS 1986	President and CEO of Fannie Mae	
Abul Maal Abdul Muhith (1934–2022)	Business	Economist, diplomat, language veteran, finance minister of Bangladesh	
Kiraitu Murungi (born 1952)	Law 1991	Minister of energy in Kenya	
Ephraim Bell Muttart (1839–1912)	Medical 1861	Member of House of Commons of Canada	
Ralph Nader (born 1934)	Law 1958	Public advocate	
Peter Navarro (born 1949)	PhD	Counselor to the president of the USA	
Naheed Nenshi (born 1972)	JFK School of Government 1998	Mayor of Calgary	
Brooks Newmark (born 1958)	College 1980	Member of British Parliament	
Archie Norman (born 1954)	Business	Member of British Parliament	
Grover Norquist (born 1956)	College 1978; Business 1981	Activist	
Michelle Obama (born 1964)	Law 1988	First Lady of the United States, political activist	
Ngozi Okonjo-Iweala (born 1954)	College 1981	Finance minister of Nigeria, foreign affairs minister of Nigeria	
Joe Oliver (born 1940)	Business 1970	Member of House of Commons of Canada	
James Otis (1725–1783)	College 1743; A.M. 1746	Lawyer influential in American Revolution	
Samuel Allyne Otis (1740–1814)	College 1759	1st secretary of the U.S. Senate	
Prince Ali-Reza Pahlavi, of Iran (Persia) (1966–2011)	PhD student at the time of his death	Member of the Pahlavi Imperial Family of Iran (Persia); younger son of the former Shah of Iran, Mohammad Reza Pahlavi, and his third wife Empress Farah Pahlavi; second in order of succession to the Iranian throne before the Iranian Revolution	
Robert Treat Paine (1731–1814)	College 1749	Signer of United States Declaration of Independence	
Kiko Pangilinan (born 1963)	HKS 1998	Senator and majority leader of the Senate of the Philippines	
Clay Pell		United States Department of Education official	
George Halsey Perley (1857–1938)	College 1878	Member of House of Commons of Canada	
Claire Perry (born 1964)	Business	Member of British Parliament	
José Piñera (born 1948)	Economics, Grad School M.A. 1972, PhD 1974	Chile minister of labor and Social Security; minister of mines (under President Augusto Pinochet) 1978–80; enacted world's first system of private retirement accounts; known as one of the Chicago Boys	
Loulan Pitre Jr. (born 1961)	Undergraduate 1983, Law 1986	New Orleans lawyer and former member of the Louisiana House of Representatives for Lafource Parish, Louisiana	
Stuart Rabner (born 1960)	Law 1984	New Jersey attorney general	
Prince Radu of Romania (born 1960)	Executive Program 2004	Son-in-law of former King Michael I of Romania; in 1996 he married Princess Margarita of Romania, the king's eldest daughter and the Crown Princess of Romania, known as the "Custodian of the Romanian Crown"	
Franklin Raines (born 1949)	College 1971; Law 1976	Chairman and CEO of Fannie Mae	
Vivek Ramaswamy (born 1985)	College 2007	Candidate for president of the United States in 2024	
Murray Rankin (born 1950)	Law	Member of House of Commons of Canada	
Lois Rice (1933–2017)	Radcliffe 1954	Vice president of the College Board and architect of the Pell Grant	
Rosa Gumataotao Rios (born 1966)	College 1987	Treasurer of the United States	
Jesse Robredo (1958–2012)	M.P.A. 1999	Secretary of the Department of the Interior and Local Government of the Philippines	
Mimi Rocah (born 1970)	College 1992	District attorney for Westchester County	
Maurice Roche, 4th Baron Fermoy (1885–1955)	College 1909	Member of British Parliament	
Mohammad Sabah Al-Salem Al-Sabah (born 1955)	PhD	Son of late Emir of Kuwait, Sheikh Sabah III Al-Salim Al-Sabah; ambassador of Kuwait to the U.S. 1993–2003; minister of Foreign Affairs of Kuwait 2003–2011; current deputy prime minister of Kuwait; his elder brother is Sheikh Salem Sabah Al-Salem Al-Sabah, former defense and interior minister	
Sadruddin Aga Khan (1933–2003)	College 1954	Prince, son of Aga Khan III, 48th imam of Nizari Ismailism; U.N. high commissioner for Refugees 1966–1978	
Lobsang Sangay (born 1963)	LLM	Sikyong of the Central Tibetan Administration	
Surakiart Sathirathai (born 1958)	Law	Foreign minister of Thailand	
G. David Schine (1927–1996)	College 1949	Entrepreneur, businessman, political activist	
Phyllis Schlafly (1924–2016)	Graduate School of Arts and Sciences 1945	Political activist	
Klaus Schwab (born 1938)	KSG 1967	Founder and executive chairman of the World Economic Forum	
Jyotiraditya Scindia (born 1971)	College 1993	Indian member of Parliament and Union minister of state for IT and Communications	
Joel Herbert Seaverns (1860–1923)	College 1881	Member of British Parliament	
Emilio Sempris (born 1973)	Sustainability 2021	Former Minister of Environment of Panama	
Nancy Sherman	1982	Professor of Philosophy at Georgetown University, military ethicist	
Faryar Shirzad (born 1966)	HKS	Advisor to U.S. President George W. Bush	
Bob Shrum (born 1943)	Law 1968	Political consultant	
Jayant Sinha (born 1963)	Business, 1992	Minister of state for finance, member of Parliament in the First Modi ministry, former managing director at Omidyar Network, former partner at McKinsey & Company	
Jose Solorio (born 1966)	Public Policy	California State Assemblyman	
Sven Spengemann (born 1966)	Law	Member of House of Commons of Canada	
Steve Spinner	MBA	Adviser to Obama Campaign, Department of Energy official	
Robert Stanfield (1914–2003)	Law	Member of House of Commons of Canada	
Julian Steele (1906–1970)	College 1929	Massachusetts' first African-American town meeting moderator, state agency head	
Jill Stein (born 1950)	College 1973; Medical 1979	2012 and 2016 Green Party U.S. presidential nominee	
Paul Stinchcombe (born 1962)	Law	Member of British Parliament	
George William Strake Jr. (1935–2024)	MBA 1961	Secretary of state of Texas, 1979–81; Republican state chairman, 1983–88; Houston businessman and philanthropist	
Subramanian Swamy (born 1939)	Phd Economics 1965	Former Indian Union minister of commerce and industry	
Edita Tahiri (born 1956)	HKS 2002	Founder and leader of independence movement of Kosovo; minister of Foreign Affairs of Kosovo 1991–2000; deputy prime minister	
Lorenzo M. Tañada (1898–1992)	Law	Philippine senator, nationalist and civil libertarian	
Tina Tchen (born 1956)	College 1978	Lawyer, assistant to President Barack Obama; chief of staff to First Lady Michelle Obama; executive director of the White House Council on Women and Girls	
Peter Thurnham (1938–2010)	Business 1969	Member of British Parliament	
Arthur Tremblay (1917–1996)	M.Ed 1945	Member of Senate of Canada	
Sylvester Turner (1954–2025)	Law 1980	Mayor of Houston	
Thomas Tweedie (1871–1944)	Law 1905	Member of House of Commons of Canada	
Bernardo Villegas	PhD in Economics	Economist, presidential advisor, founder of the Center for Research and Communication, led a committee that drafted the 1987 Philippine Constitution	
Paul Volcker (1927–2019)	HKS 1951	Chairman of the Federal Reserve	
William Michael Wall (1911–1961)	Ph.D 1954	Member of Senate of Canada	
Martha M. Walz (born 1953)	HKS 2000	Democratic member of the Massachusetts House of Representatives	
Wang Dan (born 1969)	Ph.D. in history 2008	Chinese dissident and student leader in the Tiananmen Square protests of 1989	
George F. Ward	M.P.A.	Former U.S. ambassador to Namibia	
Joseph Warren (1741–1775)	College 1759; A.M. 1762	Physician, soldier, activist	
Alexander Watson	College 1961	Ambassador, diplomat	
Kevin White	HKS 1957	Mayor of Boston	
Dean Whiteway (born 1944)	M.A.	Member of House of Commons of Canada	
Anthony A. Williams	HKS, Law 1987	Mayor of Washington, DC	
William Williams (1731–1811)	College 1751	Signer of United States Declaration of Independence	
Gita Wirjawan	HKS, 2000	Minister of Trade of Indonesia	
James Wolfensohn (1933–2020)	Business 1959	Ninth president of the World Bank	
Michelle Wu (born 1985)	College 2007, J.D. 2012	Mayor of Boston	
Yam Ah Mee (born 1957)	Business	Returning officer, Singaporean general election, 2011, former brigadier general in the Republic of Singapore Air Force	
Valerie Johnson Zachary (born 1962)	Law J.D. cum laude 1987	Associate judge of the North Carolina Court of Appeals, 2015–present	
Robert Zoellick (born 1953)	Law 1979; HKS 1981	Eleventh president of the World Bank	

== See also ==
- List of Harvard University non-graduate alumni
