= Ridenbaugh =

Ridenbaugh is a surname. Notable people with the surname include:

- Mary Young Ridenbaugh (c. 1834–c. 1941), American biographer and novelist
- William Ridenbaugh (1821–1874), American newspaper publisher

== See also ==
- Ridenbaugh Hall, a building in Idaho named for Mary E. Ridenbaugh
