= Charles F. Cochran =

American politician (1846–1906)

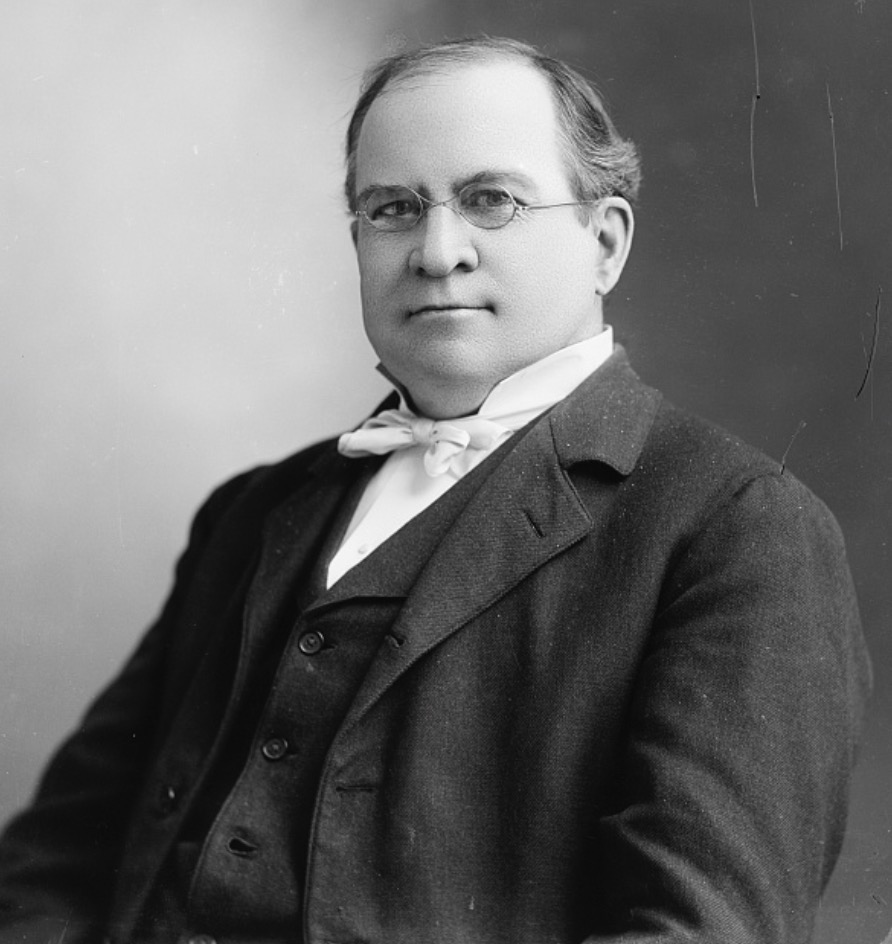
- Portrait of Cochran by Charles Milton Bell, taken between February 1894 and February 1901

Member of the U.S. House of Representatives from Missouri's 4th district
- In office March 4, 1897 – March 3, 1905
- Preceded by: George C. Crowther
- Succeeded by: Frank B. Fulkerson

Member of the Missouri Senate from the 2nd district
- In office 1890–1894
- Preceded by: Michael G. Moran
- Succeeded by: Arthur W. Brewster

Personal details
- Born: Charles Fremont Cochran; September 27, 1846 Kirksville, Missouri, US
- Died: December 19, 1906 (aged 60) St. Joseph, Missouri, US
- Resting place: Mount Mora Cemetery
- Party: Democratic
- Occupation: Politician, newspaperman, lawyer

Charles Fremont Cochran (September 27, 1846 – December 19, 1906) was an American politician, newspaperman, and lawyer. A Democrat, he was a member of the United States House of Representatives from Missouri.

== Biography ==
Cochran was born on September 27, 1846, in Kirksville, Missouri, the son of W. A. Cochran and Laetitia (née Smith) Cochran. In 1860, he moved to Atchison, Kansas, where he attended both public and private schools.

Cochran apprenticed as a printer, and in 1868 and 1869, was the editor and publisher of the Atchison Patriot. He read law, being admitted to the bar in 1873, practicing law from then until 1885. From 1880 to 1884, he was the Atchison County prosecutor. In 1885, he moved to St. Joseph, Missouri, where he edited the St. Joseph Gazette.

Cochran was a Democrat. From 1890 to 1894, he the Missouri's 2nd district in the Missouri Senate. He was a member of the United States House of Representatives from March 4, 1897, to March 3, 1905, representing Missouri's 4th district. He planned to run in the following election, but withdrew. Politically, he was liberal and a critic of President Grover Cleveland.

After serving in Congress, Cochran established The St. Joseph Observer, working as its editor until his death. According to the Kansas City Times, he had impressive memory, with him being referred to as "the walking encyclopedia" and always knowing if he was misquoted by a reporter.

On April 27, 1868, he married Louise M. Webber. He was nicknamed "Mont". He died on December 19, 1906, aged 60, in St. Joseph, and was buried at Mount Vernon Cemetery, in Atchison. An archive of his papers is unavailable.

U.S. House of Representatives
Preceded by George C. Crowther	Member of the U.S. House of Representatives from Missouri's 4th congressional district 1897–1905	Succeeded by Frank B. Fulkerson
