= Charles F. Booher =

American politician (1848–1921)

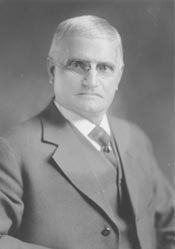

Member of the U.S. House of Representatives from Missouri's 4th district
- In office March 4, 1907 – January 21, 1921
- Preceded by: Frank B. Fulkerson
- Succeeded by: Charles L. Faust
- In office February 19, 1889 – March 3, 1889
- Preceded by: James N. Burnes
- Succeeded by: Robert Patterson Clark Wilson

Mayor of Savannah, Missouri
- In office 1886–1890

Personal details
- Born: Charles Ferris Booher; January 31, 1848 on a farm near East Groveland, New York
- Died: January 21, 1921 (aged 72) Savannah, Missouri
- Resting place: City Cemetery in Savannah, Missouri
- Party: Democratic
- Education: Geneseo Academy

Charles Ferris Booher (January 31, 1848 – January 21, 1921) was a U.S. representative from Missouri.

Born on a farm near East Groveland, New York, Booher attended the common schools and the Geneseo Academy, Geneseo, New York. He taught school and studied law. He was admitted to the bar in 1871 and commenced practice in Rochester, Missouri. He moved to Savannah, Missouri, in 1875, having been appointed prosecuting attorney of Andrew County, in which capacity he served until 1877, and again from 1883 to 1885. He resumed the practice of law in Savannah, Missouri, and also, in 1888, engaged in the loan and real estate business. He served as mayor of Savannah, Missouri from 1886 to 1890.

Booher was elected as a Democrat to the Fiftieth Congress in the special election to fill the vacancy caused by the death of James N. Burnes and served from (February 19, 1889 – March 3, 1889). He was not a candidate for election for the full term.

Booher was elected to the Sixtieth Congress and to the six subsequent Congresses (March 4, 1907 – January 21, 1921). He was not a candidate for renomination in 1920. He died on January 21, 1921, in Savannah, Missouri. He was interred in City Cemetery, Savannah, Missouri.

== See also ==
- List of members of the United States Congress who died in office (1900–1949)

U.S. House of Representatives
Preceded by James N. Burnes	Member of the U.S. House of Representatives from Missouri's 4th congressional district 1889	Succeeded by Robert Patterson Clark Wilson
Preceded by Frank B. Fulkerson	Member of the U.S. House of Representatives from Missouri's 4th congressional district 1907–1921	Succeeded by Charles L. Faust
