= Robert P. C. Wilson =

American politician (1834–1916)

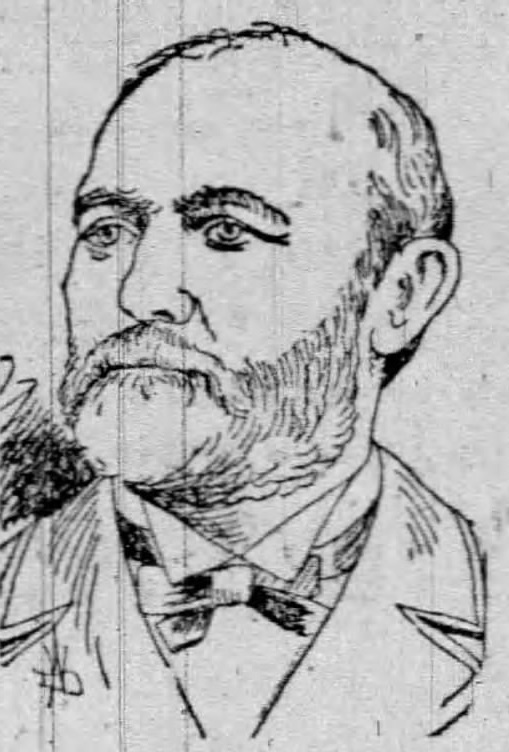
St. Louis Daily Globe-Democrat, November 6, 1890

Robert Patterson Clark Wilson (August 8, 1834 – December 21, 1916) was a U.S. representative from Missouri.

Born in Boonville, Missouri, Wilson moved with his parents to Platte County. He attended William Jewell College, Liberty, Missouri, and was graduated from Centre College, Danville, Kentucky, in 1853. He studied law. He was admitted to the bar in 1854 and commenced practice in Seguin, Texas, in 1855. He returned to Missouri in 1858. He moved to Leavenworth, Kansas, in 1860. He was a member of the first Kansas House of Representatives from March to June 4, 1861. He returned to Missouri in 1861. He served as member of the Missouri House of Representatives in 1871 and 1872 and served as Speaker of the Missouri House of Representatives both years. He served as member of the Missouri State Senate in 1879 and 1880. He served as delegate to the 1888 Democratic National Convention. He served as president of the school board of Platte City, Missouri.

Wilson was elected as a Democrat to the Fifty-first Congress. He was reelected to the Fifty-second Congress and served from December 2, 1889, to March 3, 1893. He served as chairman of the Committee on Pensions (Fifty-second Congress). He resumed the practice of his profession in Platte City, Missouri. He died in Kansas City, Missouri, December 21, 1916. He was interred in Marshall Cemetery, Platte City, Missouri.

Preceded by John C. Orrick	Speaker of the Missouri House of Representatives; 1871–1872	Succeeded by Mortimer McIlhaney
U.S. House of Representatives
Preceded by Charles F. Booher	Member of the U.S. House of Representatives from Missouri's 4th congressional district 1889–1893	Succeeded by Daniel D. Burnes
