= St. Joseph Gazette =

Daily newspaper published in St. Joseph, Missouri (1845–1988)

- Type: Daily newspaper
- Format: Former broadsheet
- Owner: News-Press & Gazette Company
- Founder: William Ridenbaugh
- Founded: 1845
- Ceased publication: June 30, 1988 (merged with the St. Joseph News-Press)
- Language: English
- City: St. Joseph, Missouri
- Country: United States
- ISSN: 0899-711X
- OCLC number: 26027494

The St. Joseph Gazette was a newspaper in St. Joseph, Missouri from October 1845 until June 30, 1988, when its morning position was taken over by its sister paper, the St. Joseph News-Press.

It was the only newspaper delivered to the West Coast on the first ride of the Pony Express in 1860.

== History ==
The newspaper was founded in 1845 by William Ridenbaugh (1821–1874) two years after Joseph Robidoux founded St. Joseph and just a few years after the Platte Purchase had opened the former Indian Territory for settlement. Its printing press was reported to have been retrieved from the Missouri Mormon War.

Its first issue was put together "on an old-fashioned hand press" by Ridenbaugh, "with a boy as assistant."

The newspaper's accounts are often used to tell the histories of the California Gold Rush and travelers on the Oregon Trail and California Trail. One of its editors was Alexander Russell Webb.

In the 1850s and early 1860s, the paper went through a new series of owners, including P.S. Pfouts and J.H.R. Cundiff. It was partly owned by Judge Charles F. Holly in 1853. In 1857, it switched from a weekly to a daily.

On April 3, 1860, the newspaper sent on the Pony Express read:

Through the politeness of the Express Company, we are permitted to forward by the first Pony Express, the first and only newspaper which goes out, and which will be the first paper ever transmitted from the Missouri to California in eight days. The nature of the conveyance necessarily precludes out making up an edition of any considerable weight. It, however, contains a summary of the latest news received here by telegraph for some days past, from all parts of the Union. We send it greeting to our brethren of the press of California.

During turmoil at the beginning of American Civil War, the paper temporarily ceased publication for many days throughout the war. After the war the newly renamed St. Joseph Daily Gazette was taken over again by Ridenbaugh. After Ridenbaugh's death, it was sold to a consortium from New York City led by W.E. Smedley. Eugene Field edited the paper in 1874 and 1875.

On December 1, 1874, the newspaper came into the hands of the Gazette Printing Company, with Francis M. Tufts as president, George W. Bell as secretary and treasurer, and J.B. Maynard, editor-in-chief.

On Wednesday April 5, 1882, one of its most famous headlines was "JESSE, BY JEHOVAH" as it announced the death of Jesse James in the community. John N. Edwards, who had popularized the Jesse James as anti-hero myth, edited the paper during the trials of Frank James in the late 1880s. Chris L. Rutt was working at the Gazette when he invented and trademarked Aunt Jemima ready-mix pancake mix. Unable to make it profitable he sold the trademark and recipe to the Davis Milling Company which turned it into a national phenomenon. In 1896, it was operated by Charles F. Cochran.

In 1924, Clyde Robert Bulla was among 100 third-place winners in a contest on the theme "A Grain of Wheat." Charles M. Palmer, who had bought and consolidated the St. Joseph News-Press, bought the Gazette. In 1939, Palmer brought in Henry D. Bradley as publisher for both papers. Bradley had earlier been publisher of the Bridgeport, Connecticut, Times-Star. Bradley bought the papers outright and they were rolled into the News-Press & Gazette Company.

In December 1980, the Gazette announced that since 1903 it had been using the wrong Old English Font character for its name, referring itself as the St Ioseph Gazette. The character was replaced.

Although the morning Gazette had a higher circulation than its evening counterpart, the News-Press, it was decided to cease the morning publication on June 30, 1988. The new paper was initially called the News-Press/Gazette, but the Gazette name was dropped altogether in the early 1990s.
