= George C. Crowther =

American politician (1849–1914)

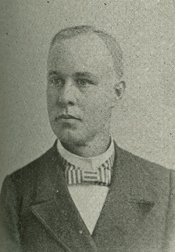

Member of the U.S. House of Representatives from Missouri's 4th district
- In office March 4, 1895 – March 3, 1897
- Preceded by: Daniel D. Burnes
- Succeeded by: Charles F. Cochran

Personal details
- Born: George Calhoun Crowther; January 26, 1849 Lancashire, England
- Died: March 18, 1914 (aged 65) St. Joseph, Missouri, U.S.
- Resting place: Oakland Cemetery
- Party: Republican
- Occupation: Politician

Military service
- Allegiance: United States
- Branch/service: United States Army (Union army)
- Years of service: 1862–1865

George Calhoun Crowther (January 26, 1849 – March 18, 1914) was a U.S. representative from Missouri.

Born in Lancashire, England, Crowther immigrated to the United States in 1855 with his parents, who settled in Dakota City, Nebraska. He attended the public schools until his tenth year, when he became a printer's apprentice at Sioux City, Iowa. He entered the Union Army in 1862, and was mustered out of the service July 14, 1865. He moved to Kansas in 1866 and engaged in newspaper work until 1873.

Crowther was elected secretary of the Kansas State senate in January 1869, and reelected in 1871 and 1873. He again engaged in the printing and publishing of a newspaper in 1875–1886. He moved to St. Joseph, Missouri, in 1877. He was appointed deputy sheriff of Buchanan County, Missouri, in 1887.

Crowther was elected city treasurer of St. Joseph in 1888 and reelected in 1890. He was an unsuccessful candidate for election in 1892 to the Fifty-third Congress.

Crowther was elected as a Republican to the Fifty-fourth Congress (March 4, 1895 – March 3, 1897). He was an unsuccessful candidate for reelection in 1896 to the Fifty-fifth Congress. He was an unsuccessful candidate for mayor of St. Joseph in 1904. He engaged in the manufacture of iron and steel in St. Joseph, Missouri, until his death there March 18, 1914. He was interred in Oakland Cemetery.

U.S. House of Representatives
Preceded by Daniel Dee Burnes	Member of the U.S. House of Representatives from Missouri's 4th congressional district 1895–1897	Succeeded by Charles F. Cochran
