= Frank B. Fulkerson =

American politician (1866–1936)

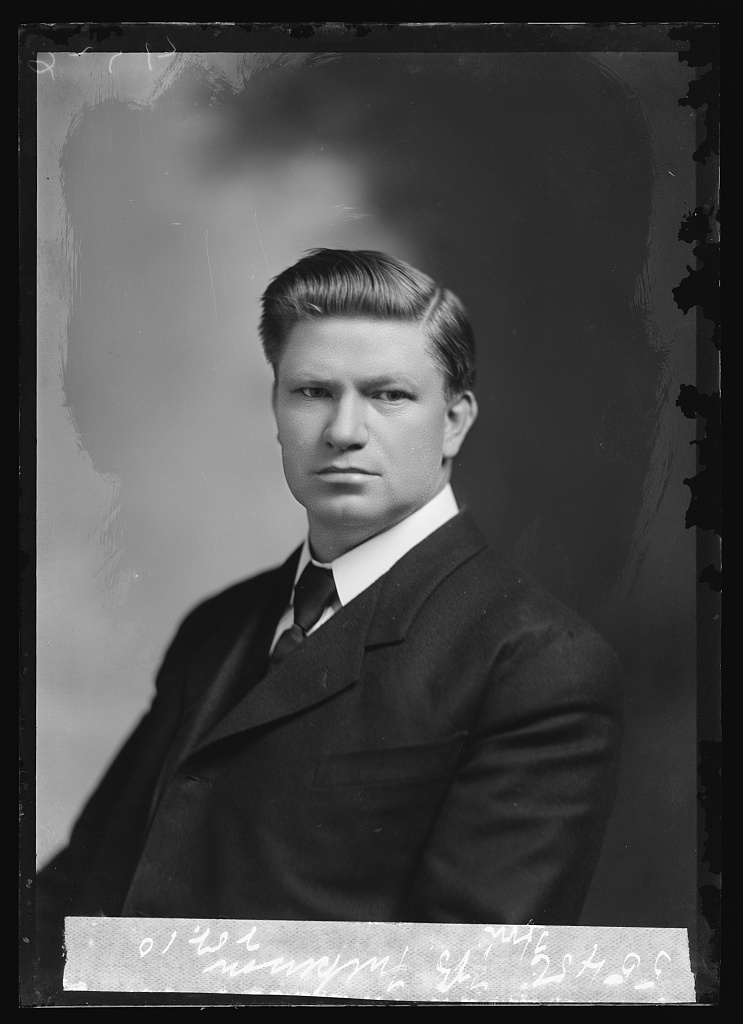
- Fulkerson photographed by C. M. Bell studio

Member of the U.S. House of Representatives from Missouri's 4th district
- In office March 4, 1905 – March 3, 1907
- Preceded by: Charles F. Cochran
- Succeeded by: Charles F. Booher

Personal details
- Born: Frank Ballard Fulkerson; March 5, 1866 near Edinburg, Missouri, U.S.
- Died: August 30, 1936 (aged 70) near Higginsville, Missouri, U.S.
- Resting place: Higginsville City Cemetery, Higginsville, Missouri, U.S.
- Party: Republican
- Education: University of Michigan; University of Missouri School of Law
- Profession: Politician, lawyer

Frank Ballard Fulkerson (March 5, 1866 – August 30, 1936) was a U.S. representative from Missouri.

Born near Edinburg, Missouri, Fulkerson moved with his parents to a farm near Higginsville, Missouri. He attended the common schools and graduated from Westminster College, Fulton, Missouri, in 1888. He then taught school for two years.

Fulkerson attended the law department of the University of Michigan at Ann Arbor, graduating from the law department of the University of Missouri in Columbia, Missouri in 1892. He was admitted to the bar the same year and commenced practice in Warrensburg, Missouri. After serving as city attorney of Warrensburg from 1893 to 1895, he was prosecuting attorney of Johnson County for two years 1895 and 1896. Fulkerson's law practice continued as he moved first to Holden, Missouri in 1897 and then to St. Joseph, Missouri in 1900. In 1899 and 1900 he served as city attorney of Holden.

Fulkerson was elected as a Republican to the Fifty-ninth Congress (March 4, 1905 – March 3, 1907). However, his bid for reelection in 1906 to the Sixtieth Congress was unsuccessful. He also made unsuccessful bids for attorney general of Missouri in 1908 and for mayor of St. Joseph, Missouri in that same year.

Fulkerson resumed the practice of law in St. Joseph, Missouri and served as delegate to several Republican State conventions, as well as to the Republican National Convention in 1908. He served as president of the city police board in 1909 and as city counselor of St. Joseph in 1913 and 1914. He returned to Lafayette County, Missouri, in 1918 and continued the practice of law, also engaging in agricultural pursuits near Higginsville. He served as prosecuting attorney of Lafayette County in 1921–1925.

Fulkerson died near Higginsville, Missouri, August 30, 1936. He was interred in Higginsville City Cemetery.

Party political offices
Preceded by Herbert S. Hadley	Republican nominee for Missouri Attorney General; 1908	Succeeded by James H. Mason
U.S. House of Representatives
Preceded by Charles F. Cochran	Member of the U.S. House of Representatives from Missouri's 4th congressional district 1905–1907	Succeeded by Charles F. Booher
