= Charles M. Palmer =

American editor

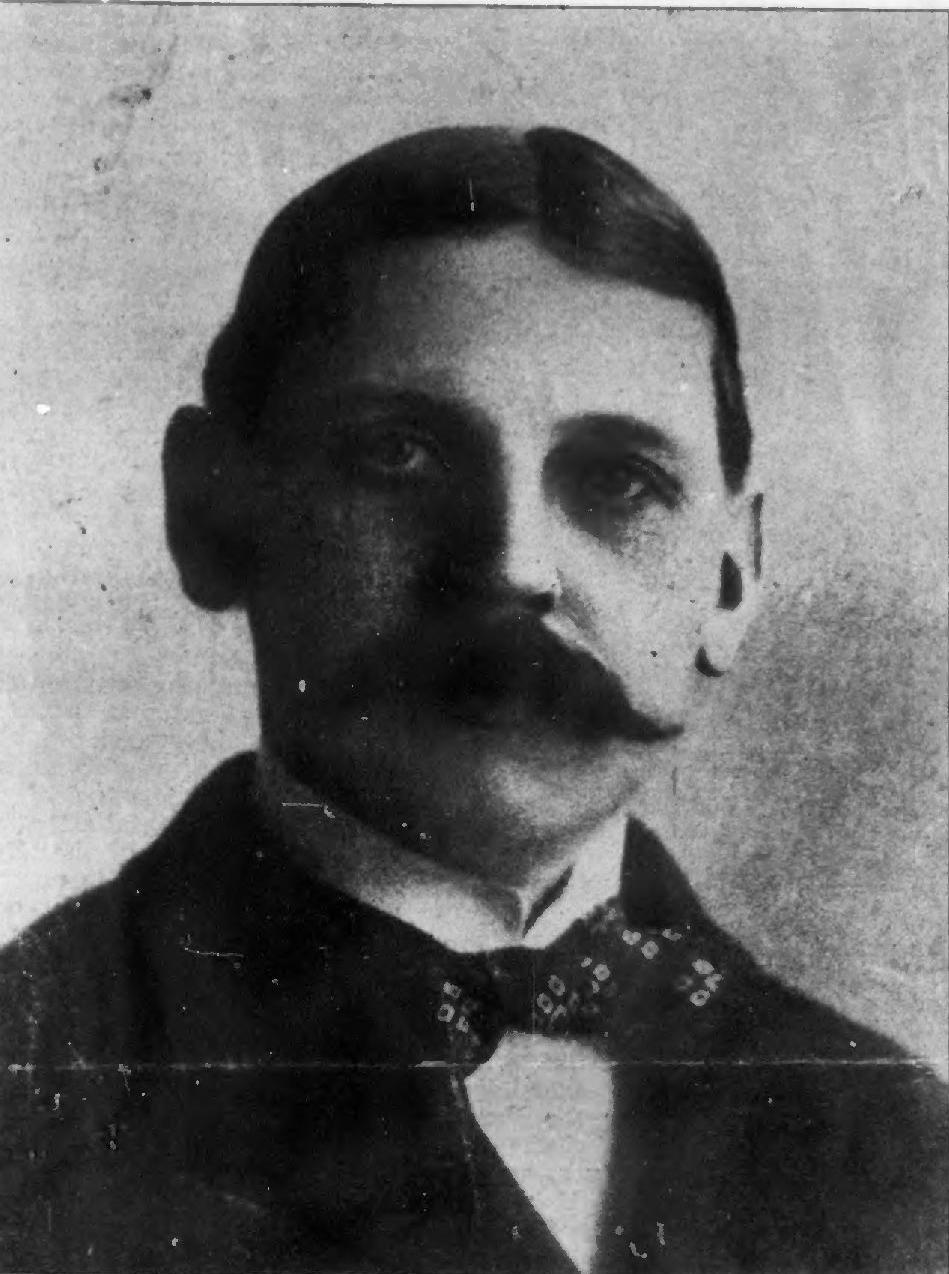
- Born: October 3, 1856; La Crosse, Wisconsin
- Died: December 10, 1949 (aged 93); Saranac Lake, New York
- Occupation: editor

Charles M. Palmer (October 3, 1856 – December 10, 1949) was a Midwest newspaper broker who assembled much of the William Randolph Hearst media empire and an organizer of the Associated Press.

Palmer was born in a log cabin in La Crosse, Wisconsin. He initially worked at the La Crosse Chronicle and the La Crosse Republican and Leader.

Palmer moved to Minneapolis, Minnesota where he received $15/week and 25 percent commission on advertising at the Minneapolis Miller. Within two years, he saved enough for a $5,000 down-payment on buying the publication. He would claim that he was part owner of all the newspapers in Minneapolis and reportedly boasted or bragged that he had invested $4,000 in the Minneapolis Journal and sold it for $120,000 in 1901.

In 1889, he accepted a $10,000 job as business manager for the San Francisco Examiner. In a meeting with Hearst, Hearst complained that news transmitted between the West and East Coast of the United States cost 2½ cents per word via telegraph. Palmer said it would be cheaper if other newspapers shared the cost and Hearst authorized him to buy newspapers on his behalf with the first paper being the New York Journal. He would be business manager of the company from 1895 to 1899 and would be president of the Boston Record for Hearst for several years.

In 1896, he bid $25,000 for The New York Times because he said that he felt that the paper was in "bad shape". Adolph S. Ochs met the asking price of $50,000.

In 1900, after the Illinois Supreme Court ruled that the Associated Press was a de facto public utility and thus had to accept any newspaper that applied without restriction. He was among the publishers who dissolved the AP and established it as a non-profit membership organization.

In 1903, he bought what would become the St. Joseph News-Press and later the St. Joseph Gazette. The News-Press & Gazette Company would be his main newspaper until the end of his life.

He died in Saranac Lake, New York and he had no children.
