= Mount Mora Cemetery =

Historic cemetery in Buchanan County, Missouri, US

- U.S. National Register of Historic Places
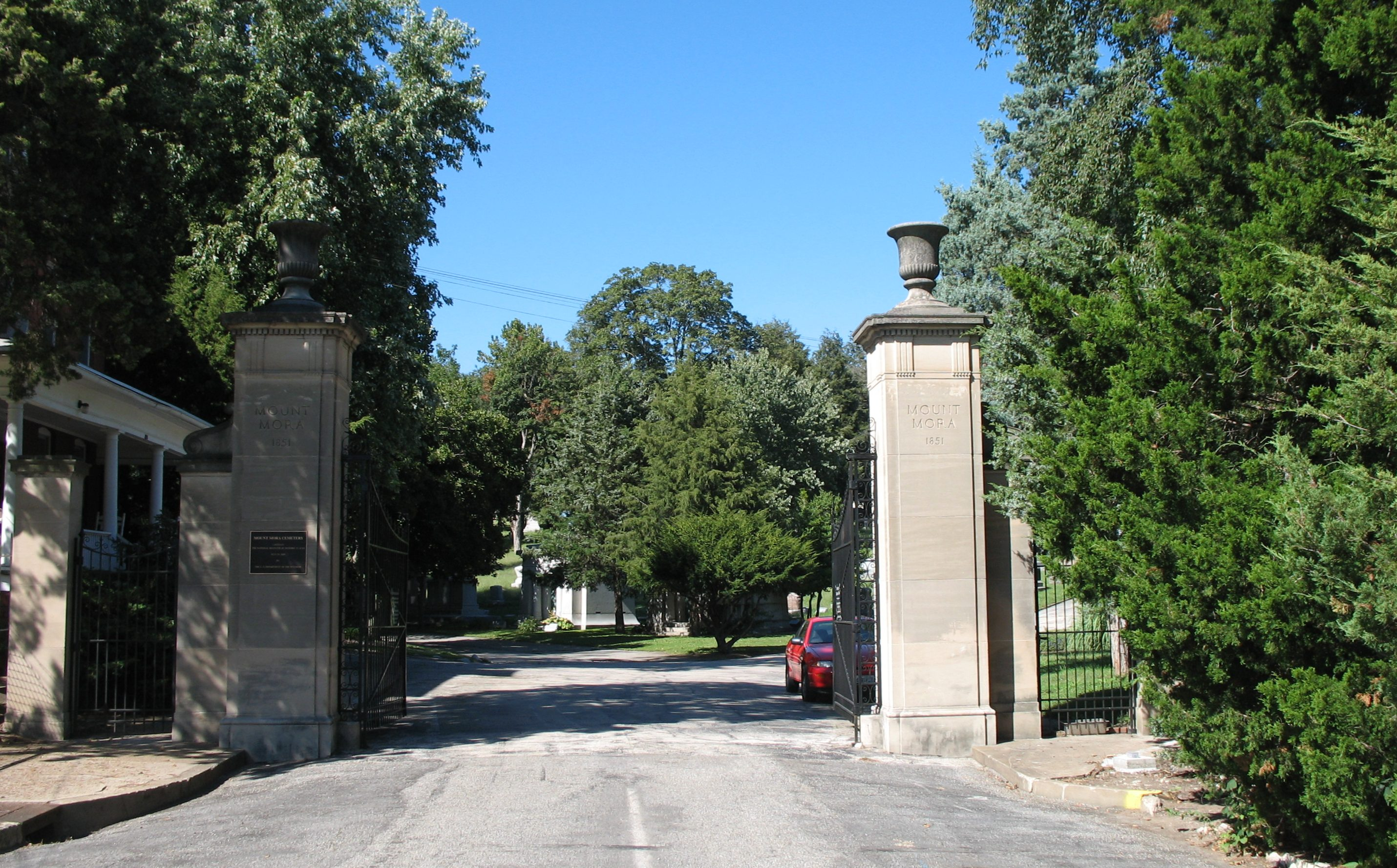
- Entrance on Mount Mora Street

- Location within Missouri Location within the United States
- Location: 824 Mount Mora Rd., St. Joseph, Missouri
- Coordinates: 39°46′33″N 94°50′31″W
- Area: 20 acres (8.1 ha)
- Architect: Powell, W. Angelo; Noyes, John
- Architectural style: Mid 19th Century Revival, Late Victorian
- NRHP reference No.: 06000626
- Added to NRHP: July 19, 2006

Mount Mora Cemetery is a historic cemetery in St. Joseph, Missouri. Among those who are buried in the cemetery are three governors, a U.S. senator, soldiers from both sides in the American Civil War and riders of the Pony Express. In October 2006, several headstones including that of Missouri governor Silas Woodson were damaged by vandals.

The cemetery was added to the National Register of Historic Places in July 2006.

== Notable interments ==
- Daniel Dee Burnes (1851–1899), politician
- James N. Burnes (1827–1889), politician
- James Craig (1818–1888), military officer and politician
- William True Davis (1919-2003), Head of the National Bank of Washington and Ambassador to Switzerland
- Edmond Jacques Eckel (1845-1934), architect
- Elijah Gates (1827–1915), politician
- Willard Preble Hall (1820–1882), politician
- Benjamin F. Loan (1819–1881), military officer and politician
- Mary Alicia Owen (1850-1935), author and folklorist
- William Ridenbaugh (1821–1874), journalist
- Robert Marcellus Stewart (1815–1871), politician
- M. Jeff Thompson (1826–1876), military officer and politician
- Robert Wilson (1803–1870), politician
- Sir William Wiseman (1814–1874), British naval officer
- Silas Woodson (1819–1896), politician
- Huston Wyeth (1863–1925), industrialist

== See also ==
- List of Registered Historic Places in Missouri, Counties A-B#Buchanan County
