= Daniel D. Burnes =

American politician and lawyer (1851–1899)

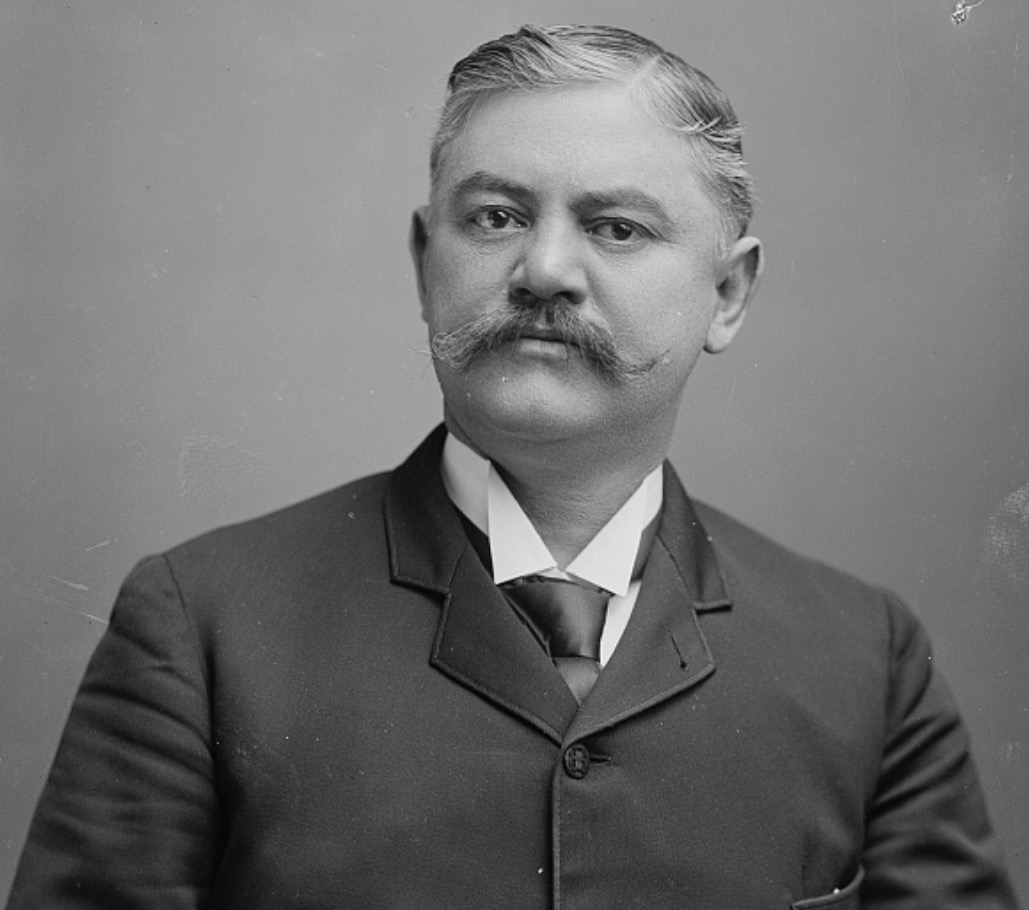
- Portrait of Burnes by Charles Milton Bell, taken between February 1894 and February 1901

Member of the U.S. House of Representatives from Missouri's 4th district
- In office March 4, 1893 – March 3, 1895
- Preceded by: Robert P. C. Wilson
- Succeeded by: George C. Crowther

Personal details
- Born: Daniel Dee Burnes; January 4, 1851 Ringgold, Missouri, US
- Died: November 2, 1899 (aged 48) St. Joseph, Missouri, US
- Resting place: Mount Mora Cemetery
- Party: Democratic
- Relations: James N. Burnes (father); Luther Martin Kennett (grandfather-in-law)
- Education: Saint Louis University; Harvard Law School; Saint Louis University
- Profession: Politician, lawyer

Daniel Dee Burnes (January 4, 1851 – November 2, 1899) was an American politician and lawyer. A Democrat, he was a member of the United States House of Representatives from Missouri.

== Biography ==
Burnes was born on January 4, 1851, in Ringgold, Platte County, Missouri. He was the eldest son of politician James N. Burnes and Mary (née Skinner) Burnes. He was educated at public schools in Weston, Missouri. He later graduated from St. Louis University and the Harvard Law School, in 1873 to 1874, respectively. He studied at Heidelberg University in Germany for a time. He returned to the United States, settling in St. Joseph, Missouri, where he practiced law. He was a member of the law firm Woodson, Green & Burnes; "Woodson" was Silas Woodson, who later became Governor of Missouri.

Burnes was a Democrat. He served in the United States House of Representatives from March 4, 1893, to March 3, 1895, representing Missouri's 4th district. He refused to run for the following election.

After serving in Congress, Burnes returned to practicing law. He was a member of the Knights of Pythias. He died on November 2, 1899, aged 48, from illness of the kidney and liver. He died at his property named "Ayr Lawn", a mile south of St. Joseph. He was buried at Mount Mora Cemetery. On May 17, 1887, he married Martha Swearingen Farrar (died 1886), the granddaughter of politician Luther Martin Kennett. They had four children together. Following his death, an inheritance case between his children ensued in the United States District Court for the Western District of Missouri.

U.S. House of Representatives
Preceded by Robert P. C. Wilson	Member of the U.S. House of Representatives from Missouri's 4th congressional district 1893–1895	Succeeded by George C. Crowther
