= Emilio Sempris =

Panamanian politician and sustainability advocate

Minister of Environment of Panama
- In office March 18, 2017 – July 1, 2019
- President: Juan Carlos Varela
- Vice President: Isabel Saint Malo
- Preceded by: Mirei Endara
- Succeeded by: Milciades Concepción

Viceminister of Environment of Panama
- In office July 2, 2014 – March 17, 2017
- President: Juan Carlos Varela
- Vice President: Isabel Saint Malo
- Preceded by: Office created
- Succeeded by: Yamil Sanchez

Director General of the Water Center for the Humid Tropics of Latin America and the Caribbean
- In office November 2, 2002 – July 20, 2012
- Preceded by: María Donono
- Succeeded by: Freddy Picado

Personal details
- Born: Emilio Luis Sempris Ceballos Panama City, Panama
- Spouse: Rita Spadafora
- Children: 2
- Education: Harvard University

Emilio Luis Sempris Ceballos (born Panama City) is a Panamanian politician and sustainability advocate. He served as Panama's minister of environment from 2017 to 2019. He also served as director general of the Water Center for the Humid Tropics of Latin America and the Caribbean (CATHALAC) between 2002 and 2012. In 2021, he was appointed as Distinguished Advisor of the Integrity Council for the Voluntary Carbon Market (ICVCM).

== Early life and education ==
He was born in Panama City, Panama. He is the son of María Elena Ceballos Périé and Emilio Sempris Ubillús, both of French descent.

He attended National Institute of Panama Highschool. He obtained a technical degree in Meteorology from the University of Panama in 1995. He was selected for the Fulbright CAMPUS X scholarship in 1996 and graduated with a degree in Earth Sciences from the University of Maine in 1998, and earned a master's degree in sustainability at Harvard University.

== Career ==
=== CATHALAC ===
In 1998, he was hired by the United Nations Development Program to establish Panama's Climate Change Program. In 2002, the Board of Directors of the Water Center for the Humid Tropics of Latin America and the Caribbean (CATHALAC) appointed him as Director general, a position he held until 2012. CATHALAC implemented partnerships with NASA, NOAA US Army Cors of Engineers, OAS, and UN-SPIDER's in the areas of research and development, education, technology transfer.

During his directorship, USAID, NASA, and SICA/CCAD partnered with CATHALAC to launch the Regional Visualization and Monitoring System for Mesoamerica (SERVIR). IABIN and ReliefWeb platforms, and launched diploma courses in Water Resources Management and Climate Change Adaptation with the University of Alabama in Huntsville.

== Publications ==
- Panama's First National Communication on Climate Change. (2000).
- Initial Portfolio of CDM Projects of the Republic of Panama. (2001).
- First National Communicación on Climate Change. Rep of Cuba (Review). (2002).
- Report of the Individual Review of the Greenhouse Gas Inventory of the European Community. (2001).
- Report on the in-depth review of the third national communication of Austria. (2003).
- Identification of Critical Areas for Conservation: Biodiversity and Climate Change in Central America, Mexico and the Dominican Republic (2008).
- Capacity Building for Stage II of Adaptation to Climate Change in Central America, Mexico, and Cuba. (2008).
- Potential Impacts of Climate Change on Biodiversity in Central America, Mexico and the Dominican Republic (2008).
- The Natural Fix? The Role of Ecosystems in Climate Mitigation: A UNEP Rapid Response Assessment. (Reviewer)(2009).
- The Experience of Adaptation to Climate Change in the Mesoamerican Region (In Spanish). (2009).
- Latin America and the Caribbean / Atlas of our Changing Environment (2009.
- Forest Cover in Belize: 1980-2010 (2010).
- Vital Climate Change Graphics for Latin America and the Caribbean (2010).
- Central American Sustainable Land Management Atlas (Spanish)(2001).
- Climate Change and Freshwater in Latin America and the Caribbean (2012).
- National Water Security Plan 2015-2050: Water for All (2015).
- Third National Communication on Climate Change (2018).
- National Wetlands Policy of the Republic of Panama (2018).
- National Biodiversity Strategy and Action Plan 2050.(2018).
- National Forestry Strategy 2050.(2018).
- Reference Levels of Forest Emissions of Panama.(2018)

== Awards and recognition ==
- Fulbright Campus X Scholarship to study Earth Sciences at the University of Maine, 1996
- NASA Group Award for the Establishment and Operation of SERVIR, 2006
