= Mary Young Ridenbaugh =

American biographer

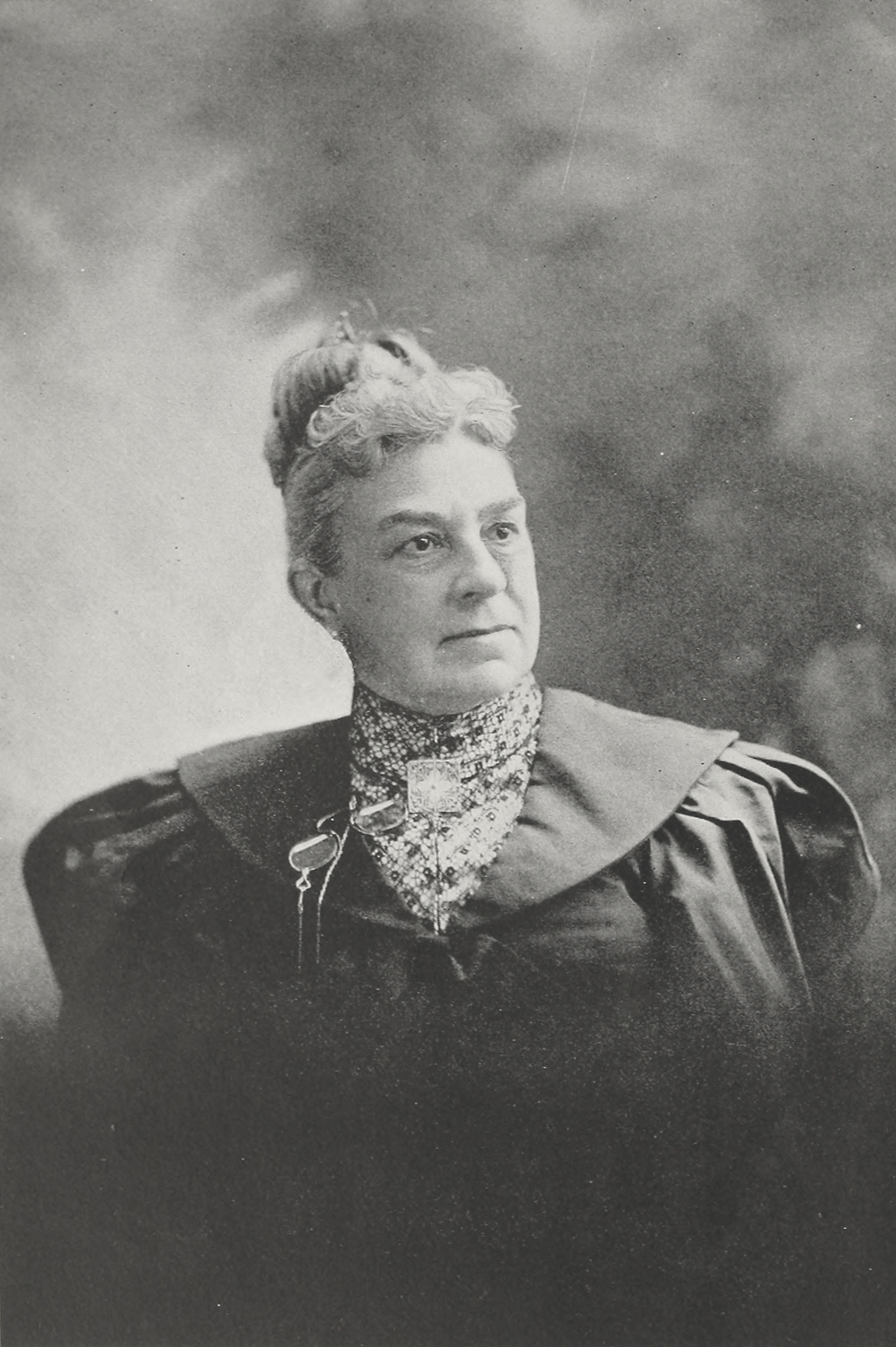
- Mary Young Ridenbaugh, author's photo from 1897 edition of "The Biography of Ephraim McDowell"
- Born: 1833 or 1834; Shelby County, Kentucky, United States
- Died: July 14, 1900; Boston, Massachusetts, United States
- Occupations: Biographer, novelist
- Spouse: Page Mercer Baker (m. 1858; div. 1863) William Ridenbaugh (m. 1870; died 1874) Louis T. Valentine (m. 1890)

Mary Young Ridenbaugh (1833 or 1834 – July 14, 1900) was an American biographer and novelist. She was the author of the novel Enola, Or Her Fatal Mistake (1886) and The Biography of Ephraim McDowell: The Father of Ovariotomy (1890), a biography of her maternal grandfather, the surgeon Ephraim McDowell.

== Early life ==
Ridenbaugh's birthdate is unknown. The 1850 United States census lists her as 16 years old, placing her birth year in 1833 or 1834.

Ridenbaugh was born Mary Thompson Young to George and Mary Thompson Young in Shelby County, Kentucky. Ridenbaugh was named after her mother. Her father was a planter and also the president and owner of the Ashland Bank of Kentucky. Ridenbaugh had two brothers, Ephraim McDowell Young and George Wallace Young.

== Career ==
Ridenbaugh published her only known novel, Enola, or Her Fatal Mistake, in 1886. The book follows the story of Beatrice Baring of Meadowville, Kentucky. After being deserted by her Confederate soldier husband, she remarries then is widowed. Her life turns around when she receives a large inheritance from Scotland.

Ridenbaugh's principal nonfiction work was The Biography of Ephraim McDowell: The Father of Ovariotomy (1890). Ephraim McDowell was Ridenbaugh's maternal grandfather and a physician credited with performing the first successful removal of an ovarian tumor.

In 1882, Ridenbaugh began soliciting subscriptions, some from physicians, to support the publication of her grandfather's biography. In 1887, she registered the book's title and copyright. According to Ridenbaugh, she originally intended the biography to run to about 400 pages, but the addition of treatises and articles increased its length to 574 pages. The first edition was published in 1890 under the name Mary Young Ridenbaugh. A contemporary review in The Medical Tribune praised the book as offering "a fitting tribute to a great man." Ridenbaugh offered a revised edition to the public in 1893, and this second edition was published in 1894. A final edition was published in 1897 under the name of Mrs. M. T. Valentine.

== Personal life ==
Ridenbaugh married three times. In 1858, she married Page Mercer Baker, a colonel in the Confederate Army. They had two children, Shelby Baker and Cora Baker (Chouteau), before divorcing in 1863.

In 1870, Ridenbaugh married William Ridenbaugh. The couple had a son, George Young Ridenbaugh. William Ridenbaugh died on October 18, 1874.

In 1876, Page Mercer Baker, who had become an editor of the New Orleans Picayune, arranged a reunion with his ex-wife and children. A contemporary newspaper reported speculation that the couple might remarry, but no remarriage took place.

On May 5, 1890, Ridenbaugh married Louis T. Valentine of Honolulu, Hawaii. She died of endocarditis in Boston, Massachusetts, on July 14, 1900.
