= James N. Burnes =

American politician (1827–1889)

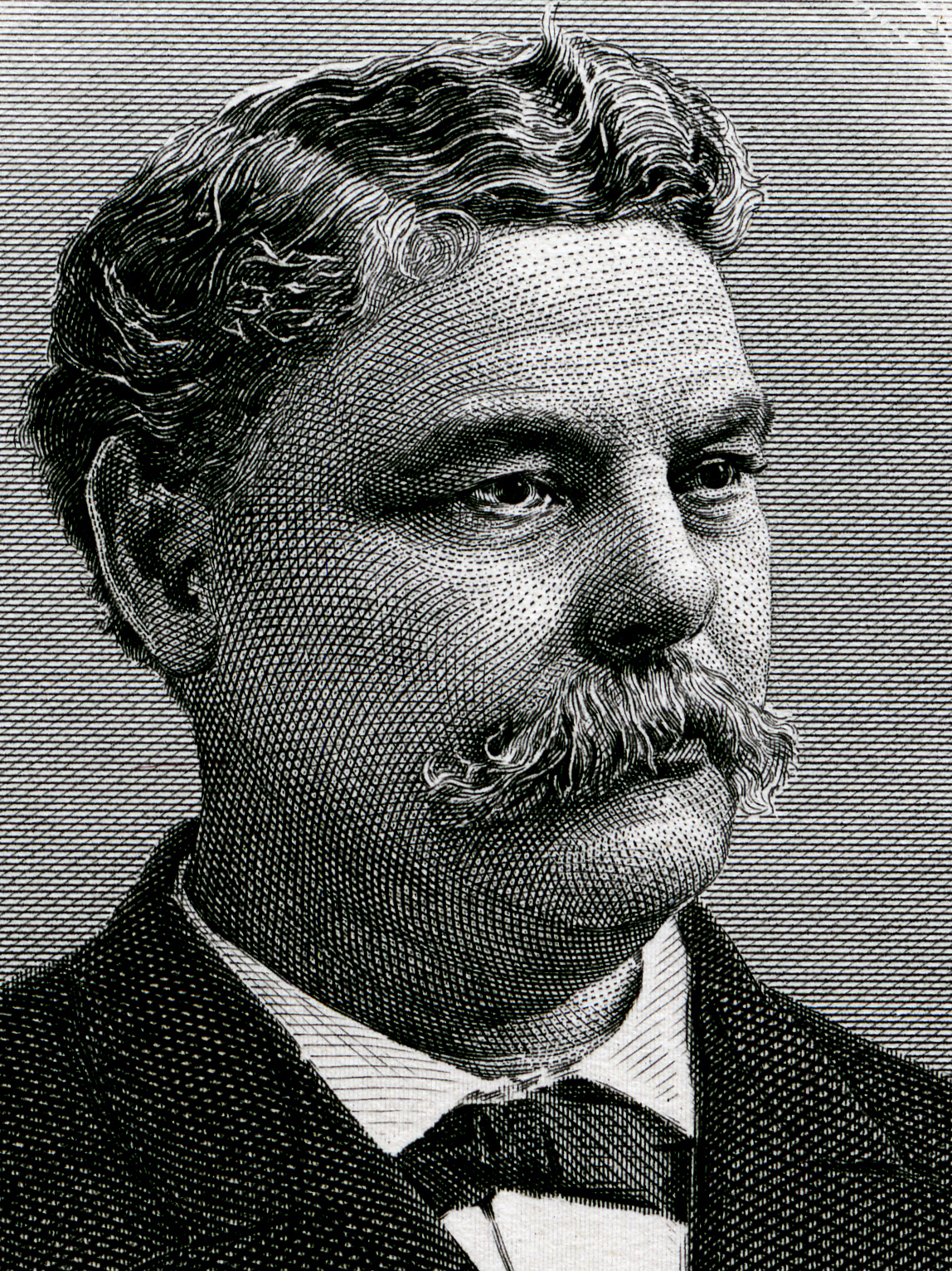

Member of the U.S. House of Representatives from Missouri's 4th district
- In office March 4, 1883 – January 23, 1889
- Preceded by: Lowndes H. Davis
- Succeeded by: Charles F. Booher

Personal details
- Born: August 22, 1827 Marion County, Indiana, US
- Died: January 24, 1889 (aged 61) Washington, D.C., US
- Party: Democratic
- Children: Daniel D. Burnes
- Education: Harvard Law School

James Nelson Burnes (August 22, 1827 – January 24, 1889) was an American politician, lawyer, and businessman. A Democrat, he was a member of the United States House of Representatives from Missouri.

== Biography ==
Burnes was born on August 22, 1827, in Marion County, Indiana, the second of three sons born to James Burnes and Mary (née Thompson) Burnes. He was of Scottish and Irish ancestry. In 1837, he and his parents moved to Platte County, Missouri. Between Marion and Platte Counties, he attended local common schools. In July 15, 1847, he married Mary A. Skinner. He graduated from Harvard Law School in 1853, after which he was admitted to the bar and began his practice in Missouri. He was a Freemason, and from 1863 to 1864, a Grand High Priest.

In 1856, Burnes was made attorney of a Missouri court, and from 1868 to 1872, served as judge of the Missouri Court of Common Pleas. In 1872, he moved to St. Joseph. As a businessman, he for a time president of the Missouri Valley Railroad and owner of the St. Joseph Waterworks Company. He owned slaves.

Burnes was a Democrat. He was a presidential elector in the 1856 election, in which he voted for James Buchanan. He was a member of the United States House of Representatives from Missouri's 4th district. He was elected on March 4, 1883, serving until his death. He was elected for a second term, but died before the term began. During his tenure, he served in the House Committee on Appropriations, and on January 23, 1889, served as acting chairman in the absence of Samuel J. Randall. Shortly after his work as acting chairman concluded, he suffered a paralyzation.

Burnes died on the morning of January 24, 1889, aged 61, in Washington, D.C., and was buried at Mount Mora Cemetery. His son was politician Daniel D. Burnes; Daniel married Martha Swearingen Farrar, the granddaughter of politician Luther Martin Kennett.

== See also ==
- List of members of the United States Congress who died in office (1790–1899)

U.S. House of Representatives
Preceded by Lowndes Henry Davis	Member of the U.S. House of Representatives from Missouri's 4th congressional district 1883–1889	Succeeded by Charles F. Booher
