= William Ridenbaugh =

American journalist

William Fahnestock Ridenbaugh (February 19, 1821 – October 18, 1874) was a newspaper publisher who started the St. Joseph Gazette in St. Joseph, Missouri.

== Career ==
Ridenbaugh was born in Bedford, Pennsylvania. In 1843 he moved to Missouri and started the Gazette in 1845. This was two years after St. Joseph had been established. The paper chronicled early settlement of the Old West along the Oregon Trail and California Trail. He maintained it as a Democratic newspaper and he sold the newspaper and became Buchanan County, Missouri Circuit Court Clerk. During the Bleeding Kansas struggles in the late 1850s he was among the Missouri residents who bought land in Kansas (in his case across the Missouri River in Doniphan County, Kansas) in an attempt to also vote there with regards to whether Kansas should enter the Union as a slave state.

After the American Civil War he reacquired the Gazette and published it until his death.

== Personal life ==
In 1846, Ridenbaugh was married to Hannah Creal, who died in 1866, leaving six children. In 1870, Ridenbaugh was married to writer Mary Young. Ridenbaugh died on October 18, 1874 in St. Joseph, Missouri. He is buried in Mount Mora Cemetery.
