= Sister Citizen: Shame, Stereotypes, and Black Women in America =

2011 book by Melissa Harris-Perry

First edition

Sister Citizen: Shame, Stereotypes, and Black Women in America is a book published in 2011 through Yale University Press written by the American MSNBC television host, feminist, and professor of Politics and African American Studies at Tulane University, Melissa Harris-Perry. The book is an exploration of Black female identity in the US and the politics surrounding the perception of Black culture in America.

Sister Citizen delves into the historical and contemporary effects of racialization and negative stereotypes of Black American women and their relationship to citizenship. Harris-Perry brings contemporary natural disasters, film, analytical facts, focus groups, literature, and political issues into the scope of Black feminism, which she then marries with historical works and events extending over centuries. Consequently, she explores and contextualizes the prevalence with which these stereotypes have been normalized and used to reinforce gender and race hierarchies.

== Background ==
According to Harris-Perry, her book was initially inspired by a television ad that she encountered in 2000. She claims that the commercial idealized and praised a depiction of a young Black girl running through a dangerous neighbourhood to get home from school. Further, she addresses the representation of this young girl as “a strong Black woman” that should be admired and commended, as opposed to being used as a source to effect change and educate the middle class on the division between White and Black citizens.

Although Melissa Harris-Perry initially planned her book as an exploration of America's systematic racial disparity which perpetuates the economic distance between citizens, her writing took a drastic turn in 2005 in the aftermath of Hurricane Katrina. In an interview on her book she says, “the real turning point for me was the race and gender politics that emerged on the national stage after the levee failure. That was, for me, a consolidating moment in my attempt to understand the experience of contemporary black women trying to be American citizens”. An example of this that she uses in Sister Citizen is the labeling of the Hurricane Katrina victims as “refugees” by the government. She goes on to say that this “had the effect of rhetorically removing Black victims from national responsibility”.

In Sister Citizen: Shame, Stereotypes, and Black Women in America, Melissa Harris-Perry begins by asserting that politics are not limited to traditional ideologies surrounding “formal participation in government.” Rather, she argues, that the pursuit of recognition, identity and citizenship is intrinsically political in nature. Furthermore, she claims that through the struggles and inflammatory stereotypes restricting Black women in America, their lived experiences are not limited to their individual development, but rather become both innately political, and reflective of their social environment.

== Content ==
=== Field Dependency ===
The basis of Harris-Perry's book Sister Citizen surrounds ideas of field dependency, an area of cognitive sociology studies. More specifically, Harris-Perry refers to a study known as “The Crooked Room”. In this experiment, a subject enters a “crooked room” and sits down in a “crooked chair” and is instructed to adjust themselves until they are aligned perpendicular to the room. While some subjects displayed "field independence" and were able to straighten themselves despite their crooked surroundings, others would show examples of field dependency and try to align themselves with their surroundings, sometimes to the extent of tilting their bodies to an extreme 35 degrees. Harris-Perry uses this study as an example of the way in which people will unconsciously distort themselves to their surroundings. Despite the crookedness and misinformation they were being fed, the field-dependent subjects couldn't separate reality from preconceived ideas of how they relate to their surroundings. She uses field dependency as a way of explaining her views on how Black women fit into a society that has been almost exclusively designed for White men and women, claiming that "to be Black and a woman in America is to constantly be aligning oneself with the views and perceptions of others." In Realigning the Crooked Room, a review of Harris-Perry's book, Kimberly M. Jackson and Leyte L. Winfield argue these “crooked rooms” perpetuate the cycle of shame and desire for citizenship, and takes the achievements made by Black women away from them.

==== Shame and Stereotypes ====
A vital aspect of Harris-Perry's argument on female African American identity is that of the three most harmful and accustomed archetypes, the Mammy, Jezebel, and Sapphire. She argues that these overly saturated representations of Black female identity inform the way African American women value and see themselves as both citizens and political figures. Rebelling against the confinement of these roles creates a fourth identity: the strong Black woman.

The Mammy, Harris-Perry argues, is a white supremacist ideal of the domestic worker. Claiming, that Mammy is the wise, unattractive, asexual, and nurturing woman, who provides home cooked food, is always happy and very often smiles. The Mammy is often characterized by her large posterior, large breasts, very white teeth and normally heavyset form. The Mammy is represented as being very devoted to her white masters, or employers, often at the expense of her own life and family (Harris-Perry 72). K. Sue Jewell said that by presenting a smiling and happy representation of a black slave, whose only purpose and skills laid in domestic work, the Mammy made the slave trade seem more humane.

Representations of the Mammy are still very prevalent today, asserts Melissa Harris-Perry, and are often presented as “magical figures” that swoop in to educate lost or disenfranchised white characters. Perry lists HBO’s Sex and the City as a prime example of using the modern Mammy in cases of both child rearing and a source of advice. One example that Harris-Perry gives is the soothing black woman chauffeur who takes a lonely Bradshaw out for food and advice. This use of the Mammy, presented without her personal struggles or individual identities, objectifies many Black women and presenting them as a resource for white people.

Another more obvious extension of the Mammy, which has remained at the center of American culture for decades, is the brand Aunt Jemima. Aunt Jemima, mostly geared towards white people, plays into the nostalgia of the historical south, she represents love, acceptance and the desire to please which, by extension many argue negates the suffering of slaves forced to work as maids and nannies.

In Sister Citizen the modern day Jezebel is associated with Black mothers who rely on welfare. Harris-Perry asserts that these women, often teenagers, are thought of as “insatiable breeders” with little self-control who take advantage of the system. According to Harris-Perry, there is validity in saying unwed motherhood is an issue. However, she contends that these stereotypes are especially harmful and punish African American women through enforced policy.

Sapphire, otherwise referred to as the angry Black woman, is a stereotype defined by “always [being] angry about something” explains Harris-Perry. She describes these women as being defined as “verbally abusive”, loud, emasculating, overtly angry, and quick to anger. She goes on to explain the way in which this stereotype silences and oppresses Black women, stating that African American women can't express any form of vexation in a political or public space. She asserts that to do so would label them “irrationally angry,” and remove any validity or significance from their argument.

Melissa Harris-Perry describes the creation of the strong Black woman as a way for African American women to “push back” against the misrepresentations surrounding their identity. She claims that the idealized view of the independent, hardworking, and tenacious Black woman is fully embraced by the Black community. Harris-Perry cautions of limitations and obstacles to the strong Black woman stereotype, despite the positive image it presents to young girls. One of which, she contends, is the emphasis on independence, and how this self-reliance prevents some women from seeking aid when they need it for fear of appearing weaker or subservient.

Throughout the book, Harris-Perry supports and reconciles her notions on African American Female identity through representations of women in film, media, focus groups and the perpetuation of stereotypes in the African American community. She reflects on her own experiences of citizenship by integrating the experiences of other black women and women in different social-political circles. She argues that without emancipation of Black women from these harmful stereotypes, true and full citizenship as it relates to political recognition will remain withheld.

Melissa Harris-Perry proceeds to draw parallels between the shaming of the Black women and slavery. She argues that through binding the body with typical and limiting ideologies, women are forced to choose between their sex or race. She presents this as inhibiting one's freedom and ability to escape the heteronormative white hierarchy that sustains racial division, and limits the importance of the black feminist voice in modern politics.

==== Citizenship and Acknowledgment ====
Melissa Harris-Perry claims that it is intrinsically human to crave a sense of individual recognition or acceptance. Similarly, she explains the effects that stereotypes like the Mammy, Jezebel, Sapphire and even the powerful Black woman can have on the emotional and physical desires of marginalized Black women. When these women are stereotyped and their potential confined, the public is denying them the individual recognition they crave. By repressing the expression of their emotional needs and by inhibiting their political decisions, their potential as citizens is essentially restricted.

Harris-Perry places a similar importance on both public and individual recognition. She alleges that in order for Black women to escape shame and attain citizenship, they must be able to be acknowledged for their individual experience without sacrificing their cultural one. She explains that one of the most frustrating aspects of society for Black women is the misconception that removing race would fix these issues. Rather, she argues, giving up one's racial and cultural identities would be extremely harmful, because race and individuality are interwoven and need to be acknowledged together.

Harris-Perry remarks on how this affects their sense of citizenship by explaining that this is especially true when a Black woman is involved in the public political sphere, she becomes an extension of the ideologies of her race. Further, her personal decisions and ideologies reflect and become entangled with the principles of the African American community as a whole. An example of this that Harris-Perry gives, is that of the female civil rights activists, who would commonly don a “mask” of asexuality to both be taken seriously and not promote an image of lewdness.

She further expands on the stigmatized hyper-sexuality of the Black female and the effects it has on Black women, by showing cases of young Black women being sexually harassed or violated and then blamed for the acts committed against them. Claiming that even many Black women and men blame the victim for perpetuating stereotypes of lewdness and reckless behavior by African American women. According to Harris-Perry, this causes many women to suffer silently after sexual misconduct against them as a way to “protect” Black culture and maintain their acceptance by the African American community.

== Nominations ==
- Finalist for the 43rd NAACP Image Awards in the Non-Fiction Literature Category.

== Public Reviews ==
In September 2011 Gwen Ifill examines both Melissa Hariss-Perry's “Sister Citizen” and “Who’s Afraid of Post-Blackness”, she writes about the significance both books have on the decades of struggle that Americans have had with defining race. Ifill claims that Melissa Harris Perry's novel “applies a social scientist’s rigor” to give voice to the “unique experiences of African American women.” She delves into the introspective aspect of Harris-Perry's work, Ifill describes the politics of race as being “dozens of shades of gray.” She follows that up by claiming that Harris-Perry doesn't seem “convinced” that “Americans are prepared to tackle” “redefinitions.”
