= Mammy stereotype =

U.S. historical stereotype

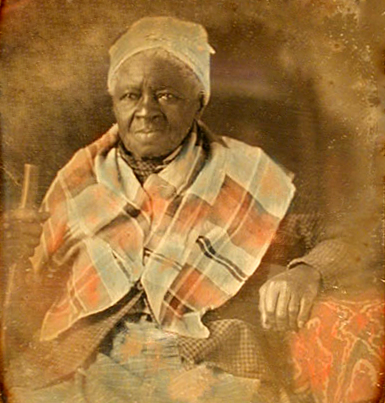
Mauma Mollie. She died in the 1850s at her master's family home in Florida. A family member described her as nursing "nearly all of the children in the family" and said that they loved her as a "second mother".

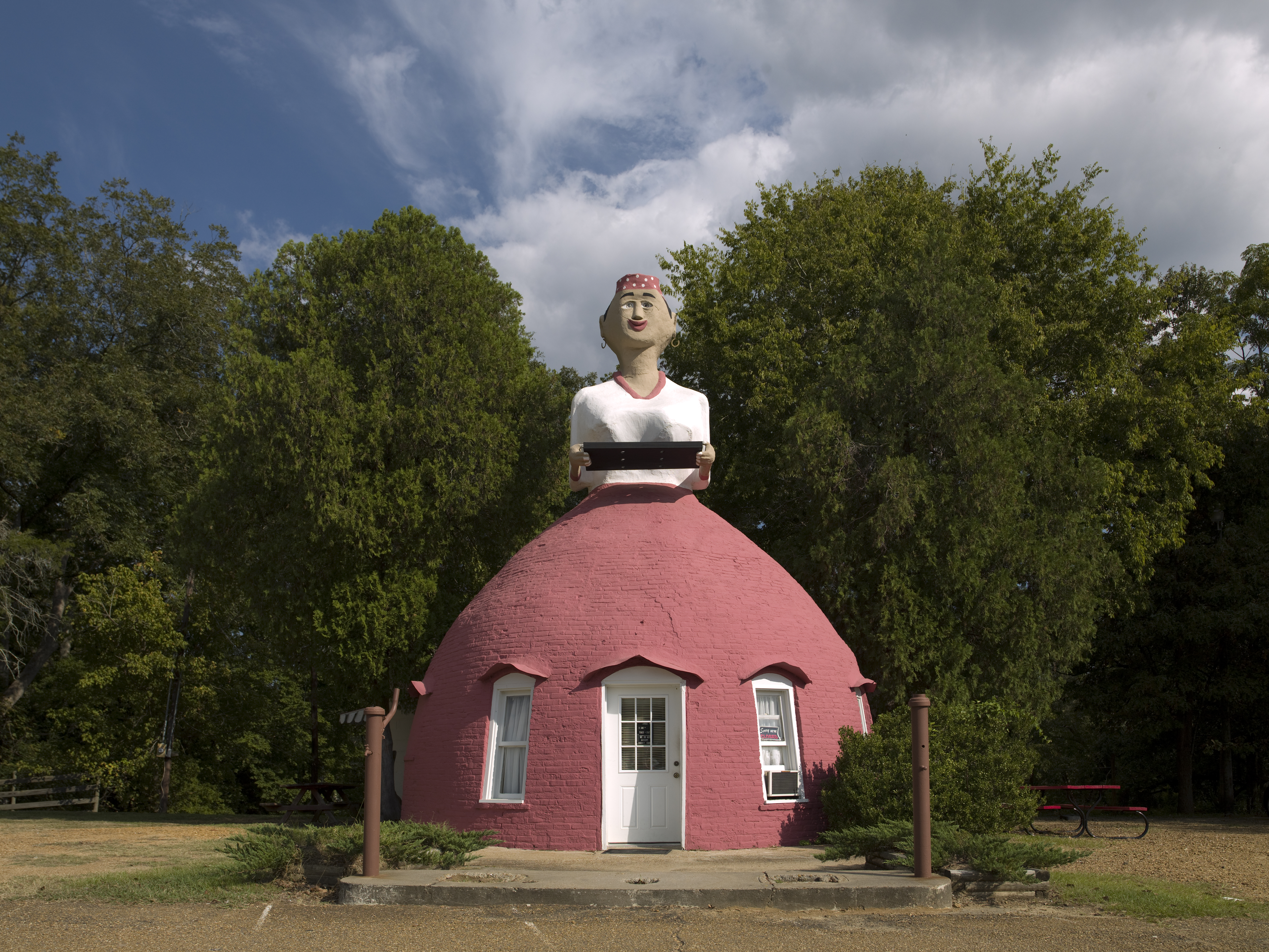
"Mammy's Cupboard", 1940 novelty architecture restaurant in Adams County, Mississippi

A mammy is a U.S. historical stereotype depicting women of African descent, usually enslaved, who did domestic work, including nursing children. The fictionalized mammy character is often visualized as a dark-skinned woman with a motherly personality. The origin of the mammy figure stereotype is rooted in the history of slavery in the United States, as enslaved women were often tasked with domestic and childcare work in American slave-holding households. The mammy caricature was used to create a narrative of women of African descent being content within the institution of slavery among domestic servitude. The mammy stereotype associates African-American women with domestic roles, and it has been argued that it, alongside racial segregation and discrimination, limited job opportunities for Black American women during the Jim Crow era (1877 to 1966).

== History ==
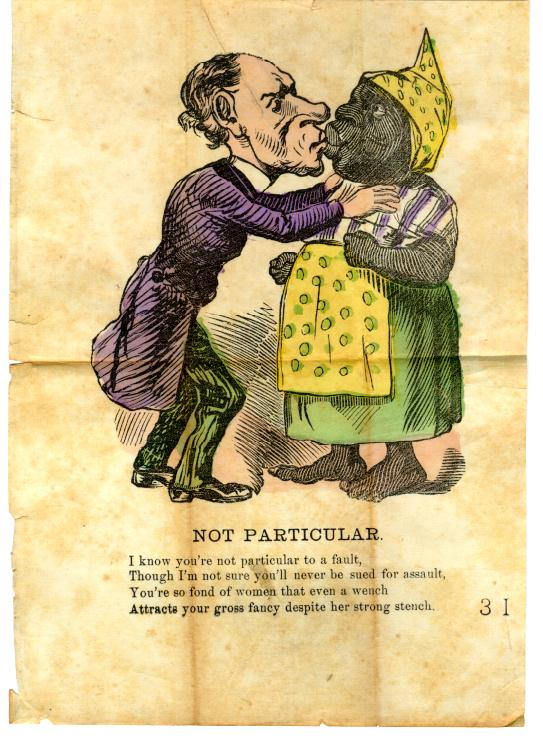
A cartoon depiction of a white man kissing a black woman on a card, 1900

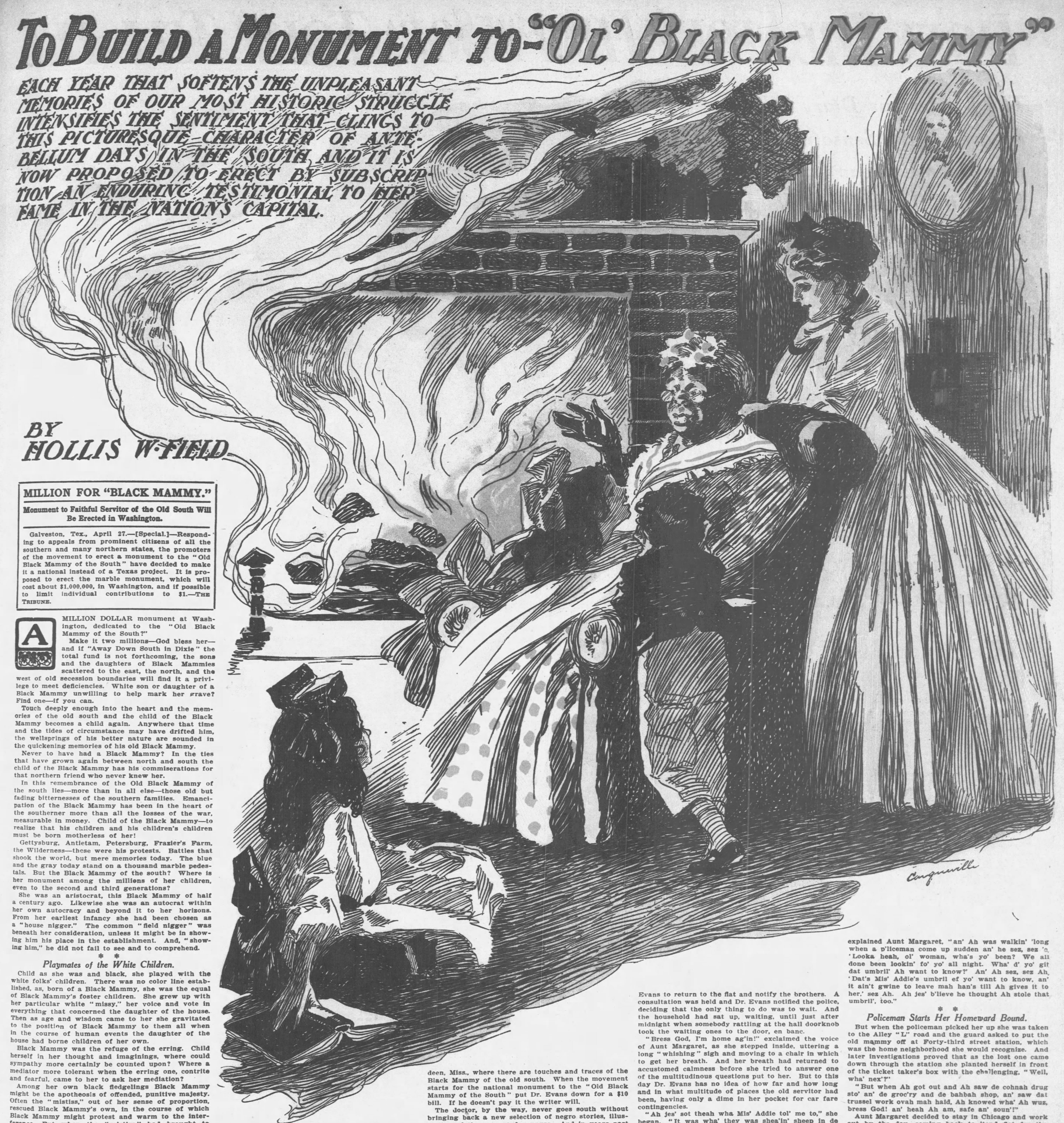
Clipping from a Chicago Tribune headline to build the monument to Ol' Black Mammy, May 29th, 1910

The mammy caricature was first seen in the 1830s in Antebellum pro-slavery literature, as a form to oppose the description of slavery given by abolitionists. One of the earliest fictionalized versions of the mammy figure is Aunt Chloe in Harriet Beecher Stowe's Uncle Tom's Cabin, first published in 1852.

Some scholars see the mammy figure as rooted in the history of slavery in the United States. Enslaved African American women were tasked with the duties of domestic workers in white American households. Their duties included preparing meals, cleaning homes, and nursing and rearing their enslavers' children. Out of these circumstances arose the image of the mammy.

=== Segregation era and National Mall monument ===
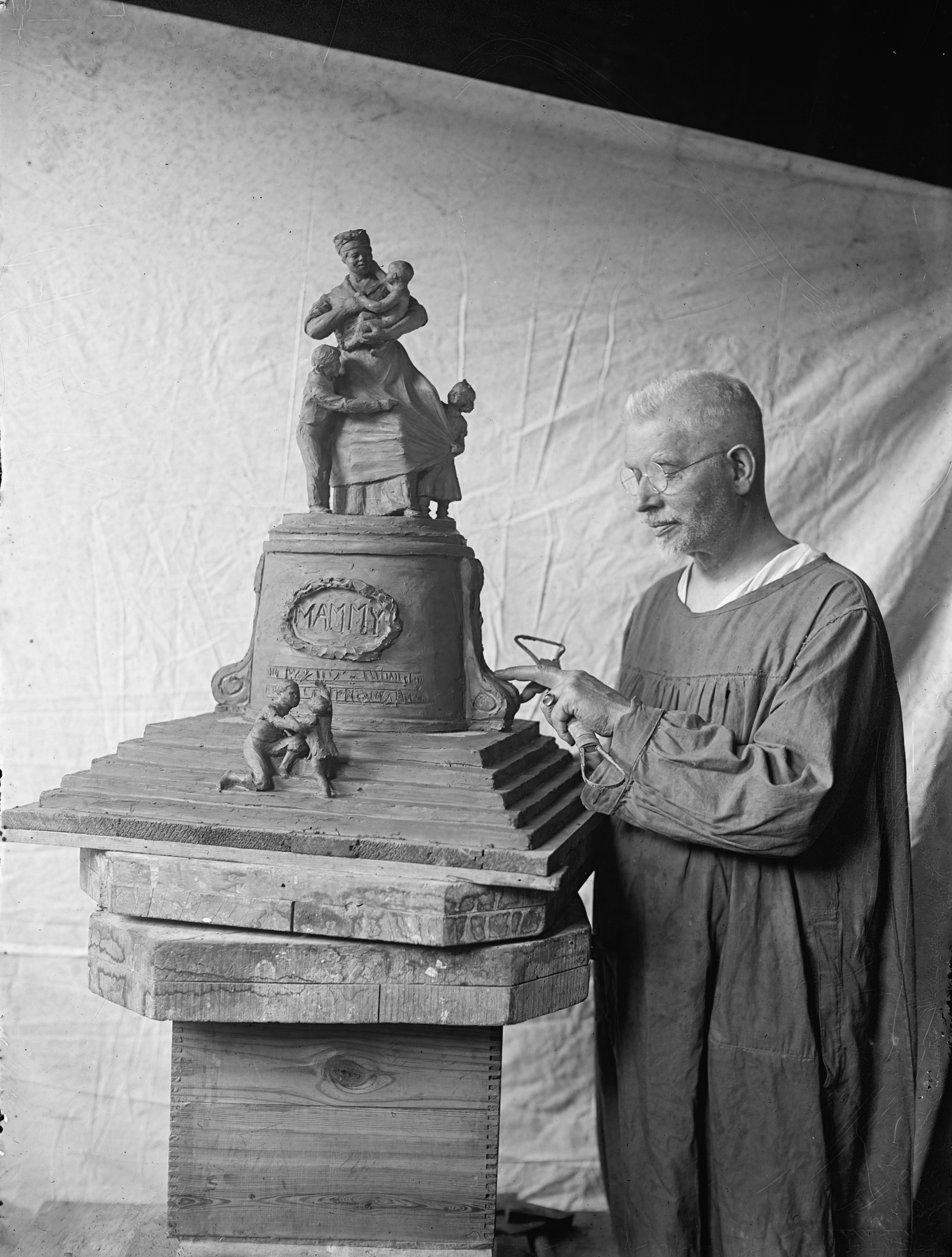
Sculptor Ulric Stonewall Jackson Dunbar with a maquette of his proposal for the "mammy memorial", 1923

While originating in the slavery period, the mammy figure rose to prominence during the Reconstruction Era. Scholars may argue that the Southern United States has the mammy role serve as historical revisionism in efforts to reinterpret and legitimize the legacy of chattel slavery among racial oppression. The mammy image became especially prominent in the era of racial segregation and continues to be reproduced, as it persisted into the 21st century.

In 1923, the United Daughters of the Confederacy proposed the erection of a mammy statue on the National Mall. The proposed statue would have been dedicated to "The Black Mammy of the South". The bill received a standing ovation in the Senate, where it passed with bipartisan consensus, but died in committee in the House following written protests from thousands of Black women.

=== Historical criticism ===
The historicity of the mammy figure is questionable. Historical accounts point to the identity of most female domestic servants as teenagers and young adults, not "grandmotherly types" such as the mammy. Melissa Harris-Perry has argued that the mammy was a creation of the imagination of the white supremacy, which reimagined the powerless, coerced slave girls as soothing, comfortable, and consenting women. This contradicts other historically accurate accounts of enslaved women fearing for their lives at the hands of abusive masters. In 1981, Andy Warhol included the mammy in his Myths series, alongside other mythological and folklore characters such as Santa Claus, Mickey Mouse, and Superman.

In Mammy: A Century of Race, Gender, and Southern Memory (2008), Kimberly Wallace-Sanders argued that the mammy's stereotypical attributes point to the source of her inspiration: "a long lasting and troubled marriage of racial and gender essentialism, mythology, and southern nostalgia."

The romanticized mammy image survives in the popular imagination of the modern United States. Psychologist Chanequa Walker-Barnes argues that political correctness has led to the mammy figure being less prevalent in the 21st-century culture, but the mammy archetype still influences the portrayal of African-American women in fiction, as good caretakers, nurturing, selfless, strong, and supportive, the supporting characters to European-American protagonists. She cites as examples Miranda Bailey, Mercedes Jones, and Ivy Wentz.

== Fictional characteristics ==
The mammy is usually portrayed as an older woman, overweight, and dark-skinned. She is an idealized figure of a caregiver: amiable, loyal, maternal, non-threatening, obedient, and submissive. The mammy figure demonstrates deference to white authority. On occasion, the mammy is also depicted as a sassy woman. She is devoted to her enslavers/employers and her primary goal in life is to care for their needs. In some portrayals, the mammy has a family of her own. But her caregiving duties always come first, leading to the mammy being portrayed as a neglectful parent or grandparent. And while the mammy is devoted to her European-American family, she often treats her own family poorly. Moreover, she has no black friends.

Melissa Harris-Perry describes the relationship between the mammy and other African Americans in Sister Citizen: Shame, Stereotypes, and Black Women in America (2011) by summarizing that "Mammy was not a protector or defender of black children or communities. She represented a maternal ideal, but not in caring for her own children. Her love, doting, advice, correction, and supervision were reserved exclusively for women of European descent and children."

This stereotype contrasts with the Jezebel stereotype, which depicts younger African-American women as conniving and promiscuous. The mammy is occasionally depicted as a religious woman. More often than not, the mammy is an asexual figure, "devoid of any personal desires that might tempt her to sin". This helps the mammy serve as both a confidante and a moral guide to her young charges, capable of keeping them in line.

Kimberly Wallace-Sanders includes other characteristics of the mammy in Mammy: A Century of Race, Gender, and Southern Memory (2008): A large dark body, a round smiling face, a deeply sonorous and effortlessly soothing voice, a raucous laugh. Her personal attributes include infinite patience, self-deprecating wit, an implicit understanding and acceptance of her own inferiority, and her devotion to whites. The mammy was also large-breasted, desexualized, and potentially hostile towards men of African descent. Many of these characteristics were denied to African-American female slaves but were generally attributed to the mammy.

=== Clothing ===
The dress often reflects the status of her enslaver. The mammy is usually neat and clean and wears attire that is suitable for her domestic duties. Sometimes a mammy would consider herself to be "dressed up", but typically it was an addition of a bonnet and a silk velvet mantle, which tended to belong to her enslaver.

=== Living conditions ===
When the mammy did not stay in the house of the enslavers or was not busy attending to the needs of their children, she would live separately. She lived with her husband and children in a cabin that was distinguished from the cabins of other enslaved individuals in size and structure. The cabin would be placed near the enslaver's house, but at a distance from the other cabins.

Although her duties were far less tiring and strenuous, her hours were often long, leaving little time for her own leisure. Her life revolved around her duties, which did not allow her an opportunity to have an individual lifestyle other than serving. There was flexibility in her duties that distinguished her from an ordinary nurse or a wet nurse. In some of the wealthier households, the mammy had assistants who would help her take care of the household's children. These women were often much younger than the mammy herself.

The mammy, unlike other slaves, was usually not for sale, and the children of the mammy were kept in the same family for as long as possible, retaining the same relationships that the mammy had with the enslaver. There were often times when a mammy was forced to leave her own children behind to care for the owner's children. In many cases mammies chose to have their own children taken away because they needed to be able to provide mother's milk to nourish their enslaver's children. They feared that if they were feeding their own children there would be not be enough milk for the enslaver's children.

=== Roles in plantation households ===
The fictional role of the mammy in plantation households grows out of the roles of enslaved African-Americans on the plantation. African-American slaves played vital roles in the plantation household. For the mammy, the majority of these duties generally are related to caring for the children of the enslaver's family, thus relieving the mistress of the house of all the drudgery work that is associated with childcare. When the children have grown up and were able to take care of themselves properly, the mammy's main role is to help the mistress with household tasks. As her years of service with the family increase, the mammy's sphere of influence increases as well. She is next to the mistress in authority and has the ability to give orders to everybody in the house.

The mammy is often considered to be part of the slaveholding family as much as its blood members were considered. Although she is considered of a lower status, she is still included in the inner circle. Her role has often been referred to as a "unique type of foster motherhood". Aside from just tending to the needs of the children, the mammy is also responsible for teaching the proper etiquette to them, such as addressing the elders on the plantation as "aunt" or "uncle". She also taught what was the best speech on particular occasions and what was not. The mammy has the ability to discipline the children and is able to retain respect with those she worked with, even after the children grow to adulthood.

=== Advertising ===
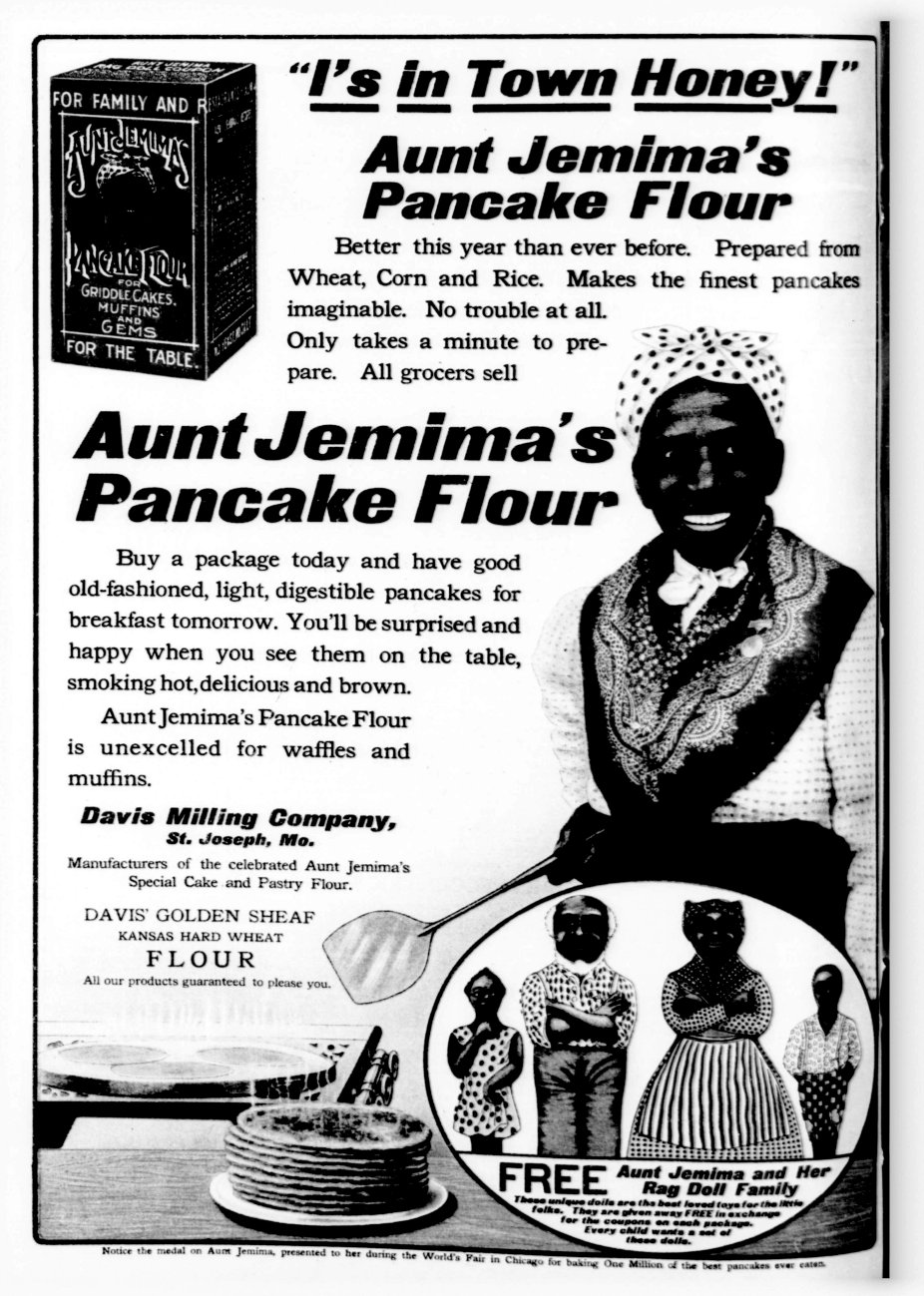
1909 advertisement for Aunt Jemima pancake mix in the New York Tribune, featuring a rag doll family at bottom right

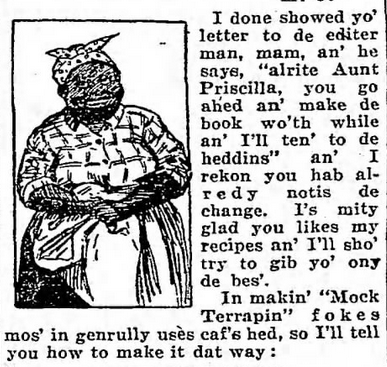
Image of Aunt Priscilla and text in dialect from The Baltimore Sun, 1921

The mammy caricature has been used as advertisements for corporations, especially within the food industry. In 2020, the brand Aunt Jemima came under criticism for its branding after receiving public criticism about the company using a mammy caricature as its logo. The character of Aunt Jemima was not a real person and was portrayed by several people, beginning with freed slave Nancy Green from 1893 to 1923, and followed by others including Anna Robinson (1923–1951), Edith Wilson (1948–1966), and Ethel Ernestine Harper (the 1950s). One of the founders of Aunt Jemima came up with the name and branding after hearing a minstrel song called "Old Aunt Jemima". Subsequently, other companies who profited from using images of black caricatures received criticism as well. Uncle Ben's, Mrs. Butterworth's, and Cream of Wheat are some of the companies that were spotlighted. In 2021, Quaker Oats, the owners of the Aunt Jemima brand, decided to rebrand it as The Pearl Milling Company and changed its logo from the mammy caricature to an image of a traditional milling building.

Aunt Priscilla's Recipes was a food and recipe column published in the Baltimore Sun during the 1930s. Aunt Priscilla was a mammy caricature who was the stereotypical good southern cook who spoke in a broken and exaggerated dialect. The alias of Aunt Priscilla was actually a woman of European descent named Eleanor Purcell. Purcell also released several cookbooks under the alias. Purcell also took up the person of Aunt Ada in a column for The Evening Sun named "Ask Aunt Ada". Black women were often the faces of these food or housekeeping columns because of the stereotypes like the mammy which associated them with servant and domestic roles.

Images such as Aunt Jemima and Aunt Priscilla were mammy caricatures that created a negative and limiting representation as servant roles for white families.

=== Cinema ===
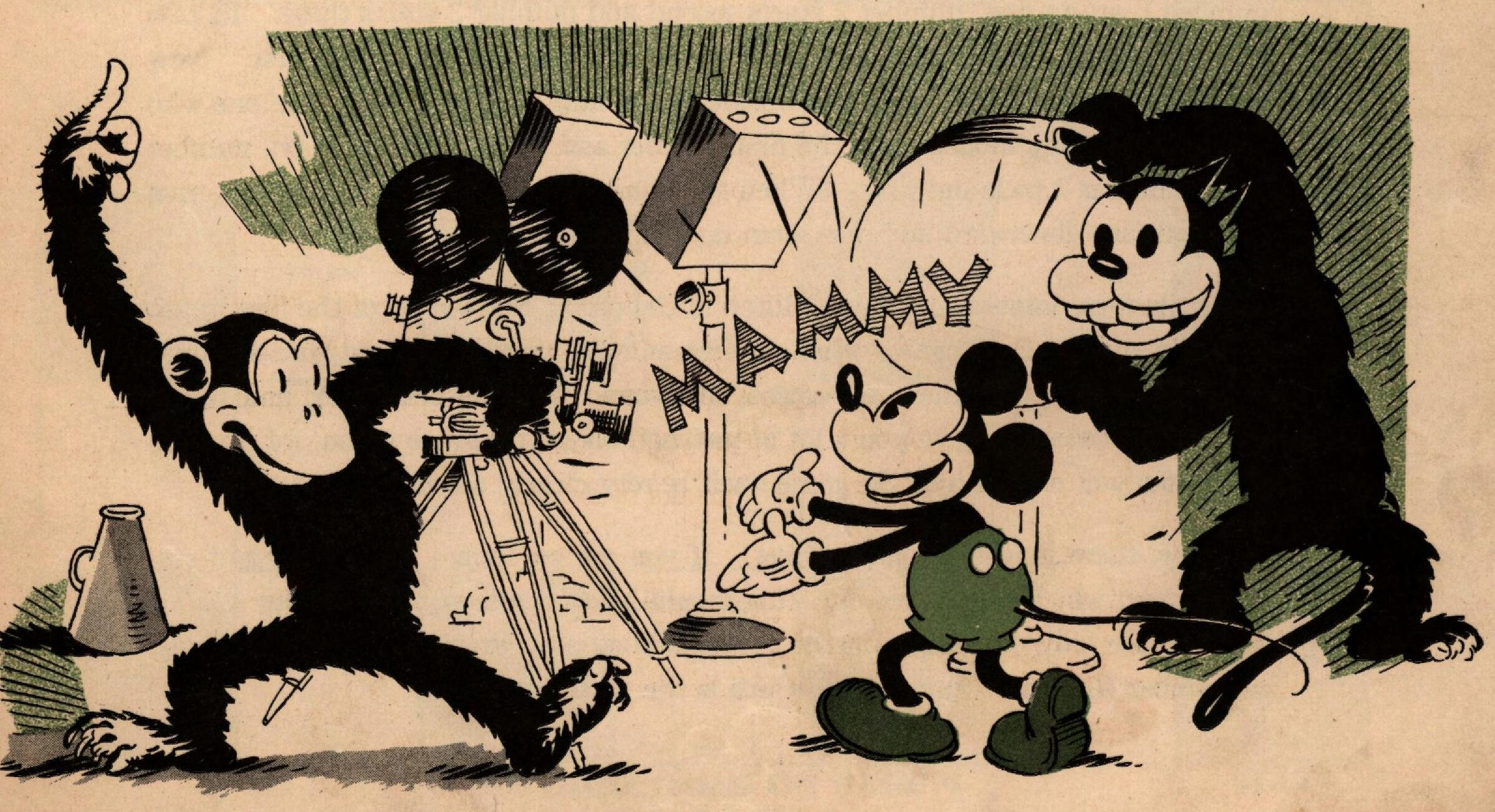
Mickey Mouse performing the word "Mammy" in a 1930 book

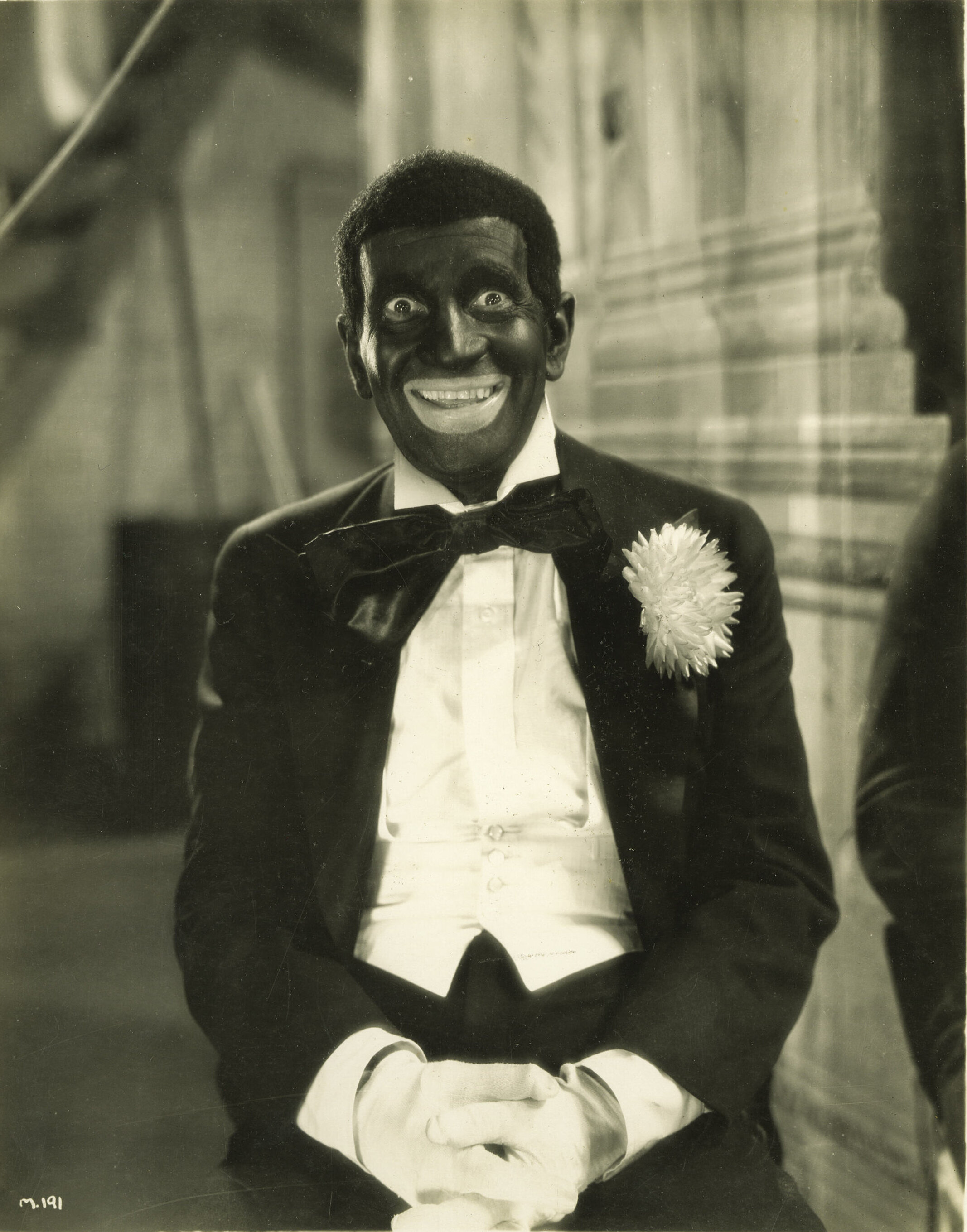
Al Jolson wearing Blackface in a promotional still from the 1930 film Mammy

In the early 20th century, the mammy character was common in many films. Al Jolson was known for his blackface depiction of the song "My Mammy" throughout his career with it featuring prominently in The Jazz Singer (1927). It also was the namesake for a 1930 film he starred in, Mammy. The Walt Disney Company also employed the stereotype in their works, including in 1929's The Haunted House wherein Mickey Mouse spoofs Jolson, as well as in printed Disney media. The 1931 short The Moose Hunt features Pluto speaking the repeated phrase of "Mammy!" in one of his few speaking roles.

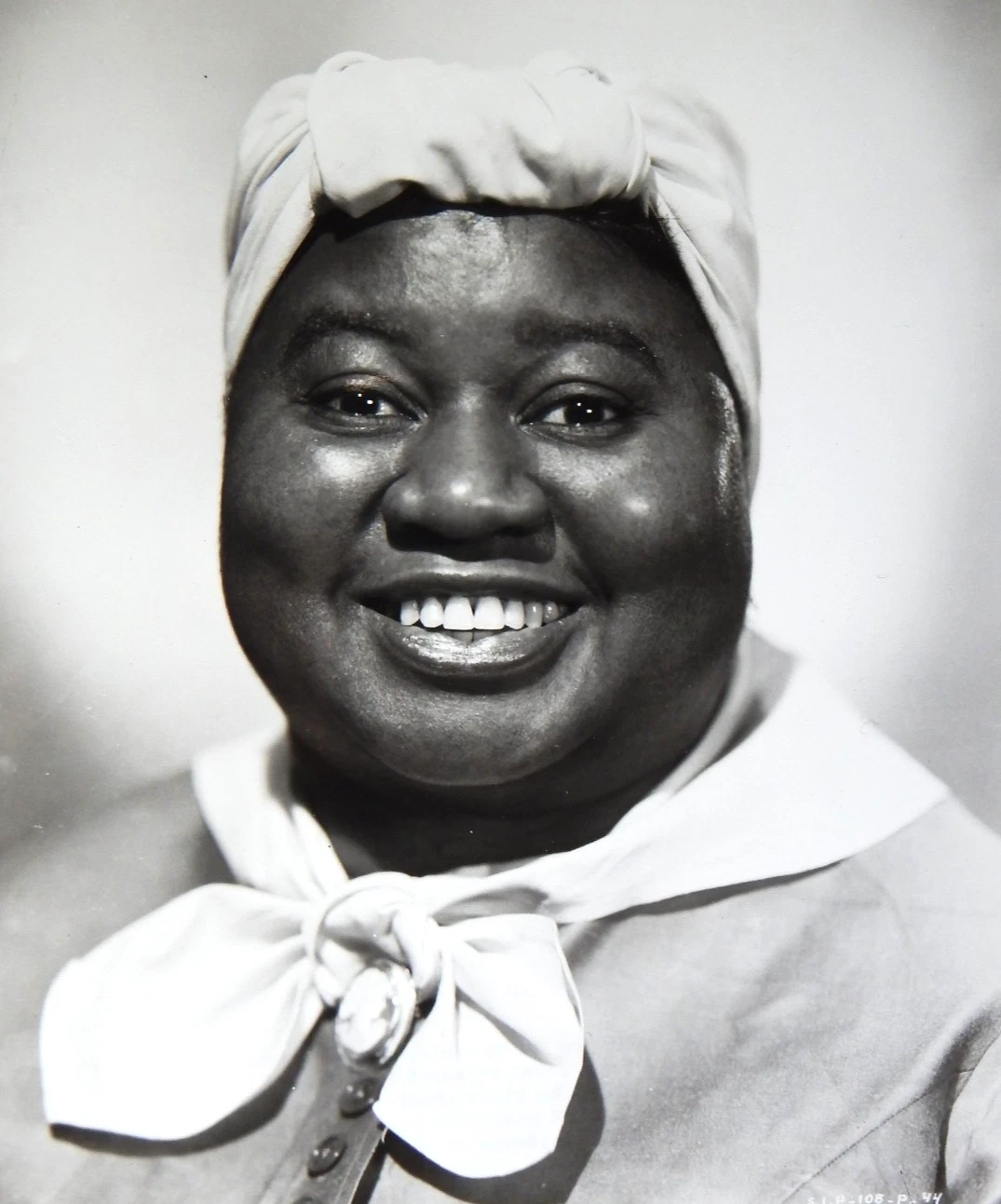
Hattie McDaniel in a promotional image as "Mammy" from Gone with the Wind

Hattie McDaniel became the first African American to win an Academy Award for Best Supporting Actress with her performance as "Mammy" in Gone with the Wind in 1939. In 1940, shortly after the win, the NAACP scrutinized McDaniel's role, and criticized Hollywood for the lack of diverse Black roles and characters outside of servitude. McDaniel responded to backlash by saying, "Why should I complain about making $7,000 playing a maid? If I didn't, I'd be making $7 a week actually being one".

Some of the contemporary media portrayals of the mammy caricature have been acted out by African-American men (Henson, 2013). A contemporary portrayal of the mammy caricature is seen in the film Big Momma's House directed by Raja Gosnell and starring Martin Lawrence. In the movie Martin Lawrence plays an FBI agent, Malcolm Turner, who goes undercover as "Big Momma" Hattie Mae Pierce, who exhibits the stereotypical mannerisms and appearance of a mammy caricature. The character of Big Momma is a plus-size older African-American matriarch and homemaker with overtly religious beliefs and a nurturing demeanor. Another mammy stereotype that the movie displays is the one of midwifery and domestic work. This originates from the history of older African-American women serving as midwives on plantations.

The Help is a movie based on a novel by Kathryn Stockett about maids of African descent of white families in Jackson, Mississippi during the 1960s. The novel and film center around the experience of African-American domestic workers, influenced by the writer and director both having African-American nannies growing up. The story is positive from the perspective of the main character Skeeter, who has also been raised by an African-American nanny. During the movie, Skeeter convinces several African-American maids to share their stories and grievances, which causes an uproar. The movie came under criticism for several reasons, one of which being that both the novel and film were written by white people and executed by them. These portrayals of African-American maids were derived from the limited perspectives of people who did not share the life experiences of the people being depicted. The Association of Black Historians released a statement saying, "The Help distorts, ignores and trivializes the experiences of African-American domestic workers".

=== Comics ===
- Rachel, Bobby's Make-Believe, 1919, Gasoline Alley, 1921.
- Opal, Edgar Martin's Boots and Her Buddies

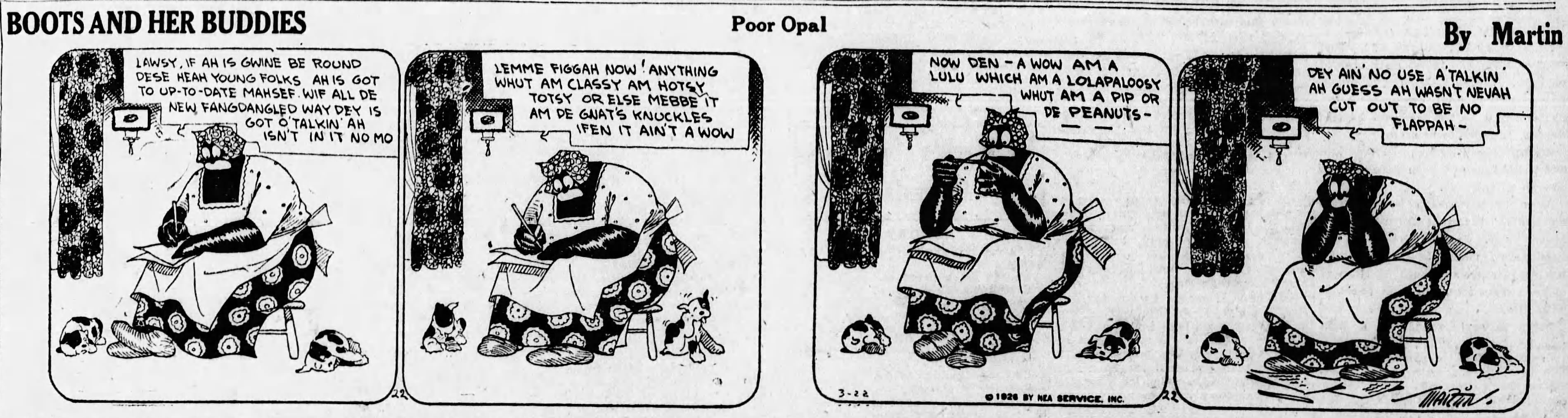
Edgar Martin's Boots and Her Buddies (March 21, 1926)

=== Dolls and ceramics ===
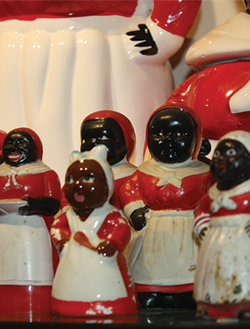
Mammy figurines in the Jim Crow Museum of Racist Memorabilia

Mammy imagery can be found in the form of several objects including dolls, ceramics, cookie jars, salt and pepper shakers, and other household items. The mammy caricature was part of post Civil War propaganda that spread negative and false stereotypes about African Americans. These mammy ceramics and dolls had similar effects as the false representations created by minstrel shows. These figurines often had exaggerated features and tried to falsely portray African Americans as "docile, dumb and animated". Despite their racist meaning, these items have been passed down and seen as memorabilia. Although these mammy dolls and ceramics dehumanize African-American people, some of them are still valued and sold for hundreds of dollars.

In Natchez, Mississippi, there is a roadside restaurant called Mammy's Cupboard that was founded in 1940. The building is shaped like a mammy caricature along with a head-wrap and long red skirt. Similar to Aunt Jemima, Mammy's Cupboard uses the imagery and the stereotype of women of African descent to promote a business. The restaurant's use of a mammy caricature to portray African-American servitude is reminiscent of how it was portrayed in the Old South. The character Beloved Belindy was designed by Raggedy Ann creator Johnny Gruelle. This character was sold as a doll and featured in books.

=== Novels ===
==== Beloved Belindy, Johnny Gruelle ====
Source:

==== The Help, Kathryn Stockett ====
The Help is a novel that follows the experiences shared by Black women working for white families during the Civil Rights Movement in Jackson, Mississippi. The lives of protagonists Aibileen and Minny are a primary focus in the novel, following their experiences working as maids and caregivers for White families. The characters Aibileen and Minny are depicted as being deeply nurturing, caring, and loyal women for families that they serve. Due to the nature of these depictions, scholars argue that these characters serve as examples of the mammy stereotype.

=== Television ===
Televisions did not become common in US household until around the mid to late 1940s, making radio shows popular forms of entertainment for the American family. In 1939, Beulah Brown debuted as a character on the radio show Homeward Unincorporated. Beulah, as a character, was highly stereotypical and was the quintessential mammy figure auditorily. The character was originally played by white actor Marlin Hurt. The character was well taken to and added to several other radio shows. Over time, the creators and producers of these shows wanted to have an actual African-American woman as the voice of the character. Hattie McDaniel was given the role on the radio version in 1947, as she was famous for her multiple other award-winning performances portraying the mammy stereotype. The radio show was taken to television in the early 1950s and went on to run for three seasons. The first season of the show starred Ethel Waters, who later left the series due to not wanting to portray the mammy stereotype any longer. McDaniel took over the role for the second season, filming a total of six episodes before becoming ill. McDaniel has been noted to have chosen to play these mammy roles time and time again as they were the only accessible roles for a black actress during this time. In addition to her talent on the radio, in real life McDaniel was the epitome of what a mammy looked like, being big in size with a large mouth, and dark skin that contrasts with white teeth and big eyes. The role on television was also portrayed by Louise Beavers. Aside from the actress that portrayed her, Beulah, as a character, had all the characteristics of a mammy. She always made sure her "family", the family she worked for, was well taken care of. Helping them at any cost and putting their needs above her own can be seen in multiple episodes of the show. The NAACP, and other critics, did not like the image of African-American women the show represented, as it supported the mammy stereotype.

Over time, the image of the mammy was given a contemporary makeover. Some of the more contemporary features that the mammy received were that her head rag was removed and she became smaller, as well as lighter in complexion. In addition, her owner was not always white.

Some contemporary television sitcoms which featured mammies include Maude, where the character Florida, played by Esther Rolle, worked as a domestic for a white family. A spin-off titled Good Times was made, where Rolle's character became the center of the series; the show focused on her family, which lived generally happy lives in a low-income housing project. Other television series that featured mammies as characters include That's My Mama, Gimme a Break! and What's Happening!!.

When other contemporary mammies emerged, they usually retained their occupation as domestic workers and exhibited these physical feature changes; however, their emotional qualities remained the same. These contemporary mammies continued to be quick-witted and remained highly opinionated. A new twist in the outlook of the contemporary mammy occurred in the sitcom The Jeffersons, where Florence, a maid played by Marla Gibbs, works for an affluent African-American family.

A Different World was a 1980s sitcom that featured students at Hillman, a fictional historically black college. In an episode titled "Mammy Dearest", the mammy stereotype was discussed. The episode centered on an exhibition planned by the character Whitley Gilbert. In the exhibition, Gilbert included images of a "mammy". The character of Kimberly Reese is upset and wants it removed from the exhibition. Gilbert and others argue that they must reclaim the image and separate it from its racist history. Later in the episode Reese reveals a childhood story in which she dressed up as a Nubian princess for a costume contest at school. When she won, she was referred to as "Aunt Jemima". The incident was traumatic for her because she felt that was how people saw her.

=== Legacy ===
Nowadays, stereotypical or controlling images of African-American women reflect the economic, legal, and social changes that have occurred to people of African descent over the past 50–60 years. The images are also reflective of a society as a whole – a global economy, unprecedented media reach and transitional racial inequality – and are class specific. Working class Black women are depicted as the “Bad Black Mother”/”Welfare Queen” and the “Bitch” (materialistic and hyper sexual Black women within “hip-hop” culture), Middle class Black women are depicted as “Black Ladies” with allegedly un-restrainable sexual desire, and an educated Black woman is often depicted as an “Educated Black Bitch” who is portrayed as manipulative and controlling. Black women in positions of power are often seen as the “Modern-day Mammy”, which now refers to a well-educated and successful Black woman within the upper/upper middle class who “uphold[s] white-dominated structures, institutions, or bosses at the expense of [her] personal [life].” This is a derivative of the original “Mammy” stereotype in which the Black woman was not only subservient but often happy to serve her white enslaver.

== See also ==
- Black matriarchy
- Dinah
- Madame Sul-Te-Wan
- Magical Negro
- Stereotypes of African Americans
- Uncle Tom
