= Stereotypes of African Americans =

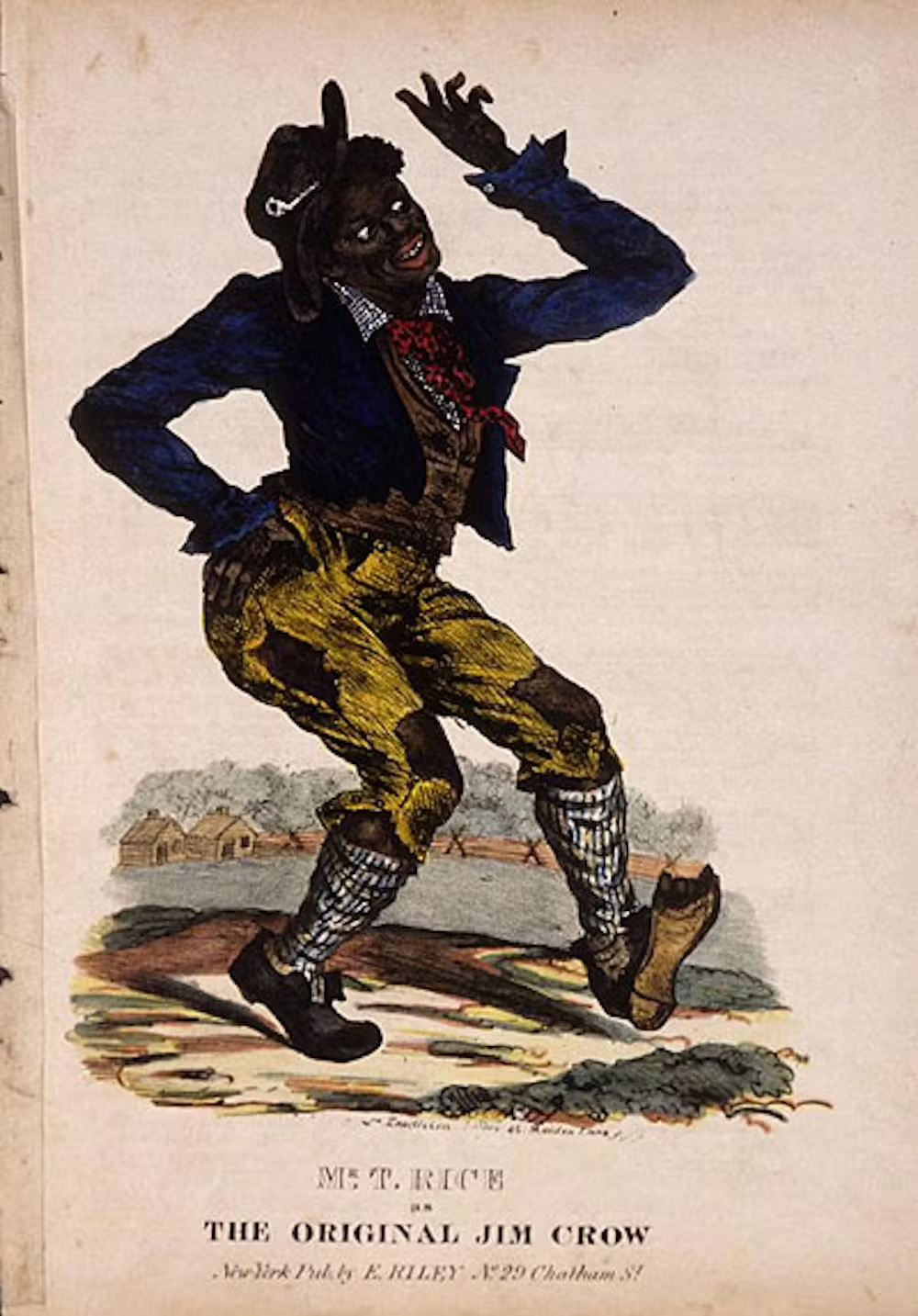
The cover of an 1832 edition of the sheet music of Jump Jim Crow, which depicts a stereotyped African-American who is named Jim Crow

Stereotypes of African Americans are beliefs about the culture of people with partial or total ancestry from any black racial groups of Africa whose ancestors resided in the United States since before 1865. These stereotypes are largely connected to the racism and the discrimination faced by African Americans. These beliefs married with the spread of Judeo-Christian religious imperialism date back to the slavery of black people before and during the colonial era and they have evolved within American society over time as justification for the slavery and mistreatment of African Americans.

The first significant display of stereotypes of African Americans was in the form of minstrel shows. Minstrel shows boomed at the beginning of the nineteenth century; these shows were theatrical plays that used white actors who performed in blackface and wore torn attire to portray African-Americans in order to lampoon and disparage black communities. Throughout history, more stereotypes became popular to dehumanize African American communities further. Some nineteenth century stereotypes, such as the sambo, are now considered to be derogatory and racist. The "Mandingo" and "Jezebel" stereotypes portray African-Americans as hypersexual, contributing to their sexualization. The Mammy archetype depicts a motherly black woman who is dedicated to her role working for a white family, a stereotype which dates back to the origin of Southern plantations. Society has also depicted African-Americans as having an unusual appetite for fried chicken, watermelon, and grape drinks.

In the 1980s as well as in the following decades, emerging stereotypes of black men depicted them as being criminals and social degenerates, particularly as drug dealers, crack addicts, hobos, and subway muggers. Jesse Jackson, a prominent civil rights activist, acknowledged how the media portrays black people as less intelligent, less patriotic, and more violent. Throughout different media platforms, stereotypes became far-fetched, such as The magical Negro, a stock character who is depicted as having special insight or powers, and has been depicted (and criticized) in American cinema. However, in recent history, black men are stereotyped as being deadbeat fathers and dangerous criminals. There is a frequent stereotype in America that African Americans are hypersexual, athletic, uncivilized, uneducated and violent. These general and common themes in America have made young African Americans labeled as "gangsters" or "players" who generally reside in the "hood".

A majority of the stereotypes of black women include depictions which portray them as welfare queens or depictions which portray them as angry black women who are loud, aggressive, demanding, and rude. Others depict black women having a maternal, caregiving nature, due to the Mammy archetype.

Laziness, submissiveness, backwardness, lewdness, treachery, and dishonesty are stereotypes historically assigned to African Americans.

In the United States, whiteness is associated with goodness, morality, intelligence and attractiveness while blackness is stereotyped to be the opposite of these traits. These views literally reference the colors on the spectrum and not human skin tones.

African Americans are also stereotyped to be prone to violence and are stereotyped to be hostile and unfriendly.

African Americans are considered loud, obnoxious, aggressive, rude, low class, primitive, dirty, talkative, religious, mentally inferior, ugly, overly assertive and having bad attitudes.

African American stereotypes are similar to the discriminated Roma in Europe. Roma are also stereotyped as criminal and musically talented. These stereotypes were created and reinforced by the white media. The Roma (Gypsy) community have a history similar to that of African Americans, as both groups were enslaved by white people.

== History ==
Stereotypes of African Americans originate from European colonialism, which was heavily influenced by religious beliefs of the time, and the Atlantic slave trade. White Americans used negative stereotypes to justify the lynching of black men and the rape of black women. White people also used stereotypes to justify Jim Crow laws and racial segregation. White men used the stereotype that black women are fecund, promiscuous sexually available objects to justify sexual abuse towards them. English colonists considered black people racially inferior and therefore used black as slaves to gain wealth and to maintain blacks' perceived inferiority. European exploration of Africa also led white people to develop stereotypes about black individuals. because black women wore minimal clothing due to the hot African climate, white people formed the stereotype that black women were promiscuous and hypersexual. White men later used this stereotype to justify raping their black female slaves.

== Historical stereotypes ==
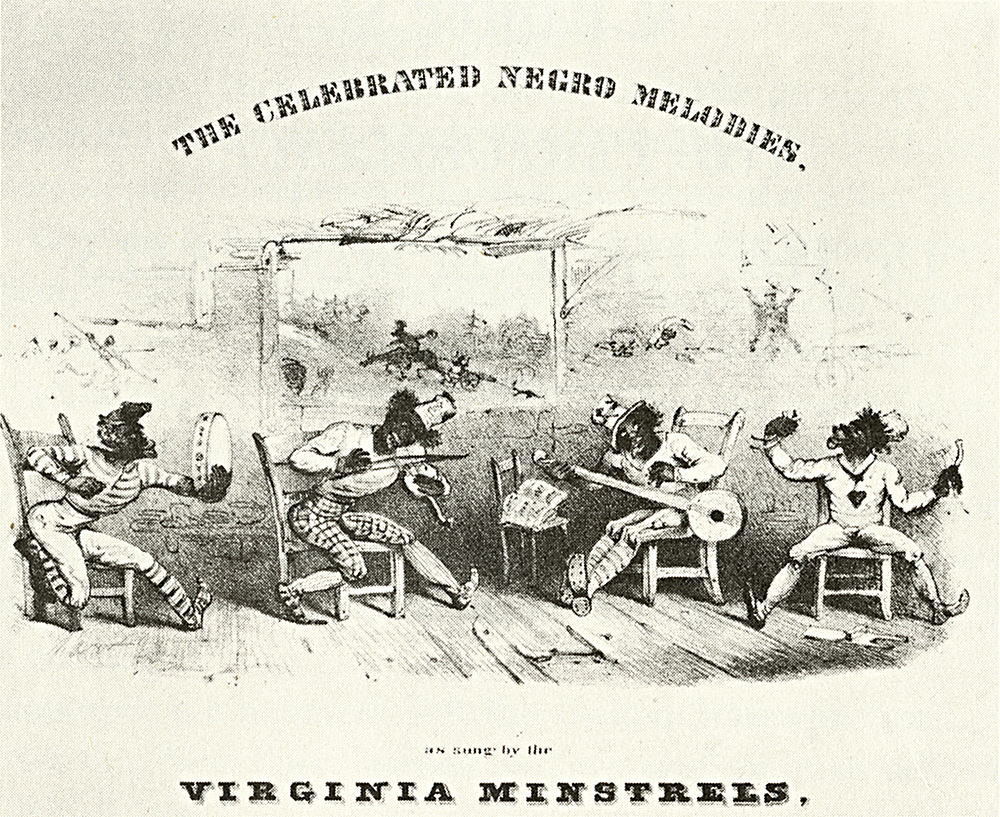
Detail from cover of The Celebrated Negro Melodies, as Sung by the Virginia Minstrels, 1843

Minstrel shows became a popular form of theater during the nineteenth century, which portrayed African Americans in stereotypical and often disparaging ways, some of the most common being that they are ignorant, lazy, buffoonish, superstitious, joyous, and musical. One of the most popular styles of minstrelsy was blackface, where white performers used burnt cork and later greasepaint, or applied shoe polish to their skin to blacken it, also exaggerating their lips, and often wearing woolly wigs, gloves, tailcoats, or ragged clothes to give a mocking, racially prejudicial theatrical portrayal of African Americans. This performance helped introduce racial slurs for African Americans, including "darky" and "coon". Blackface performers would often portray black people as lazy, ignorant, superstitious, having a high sex drive, cowardly and prone to thievery.

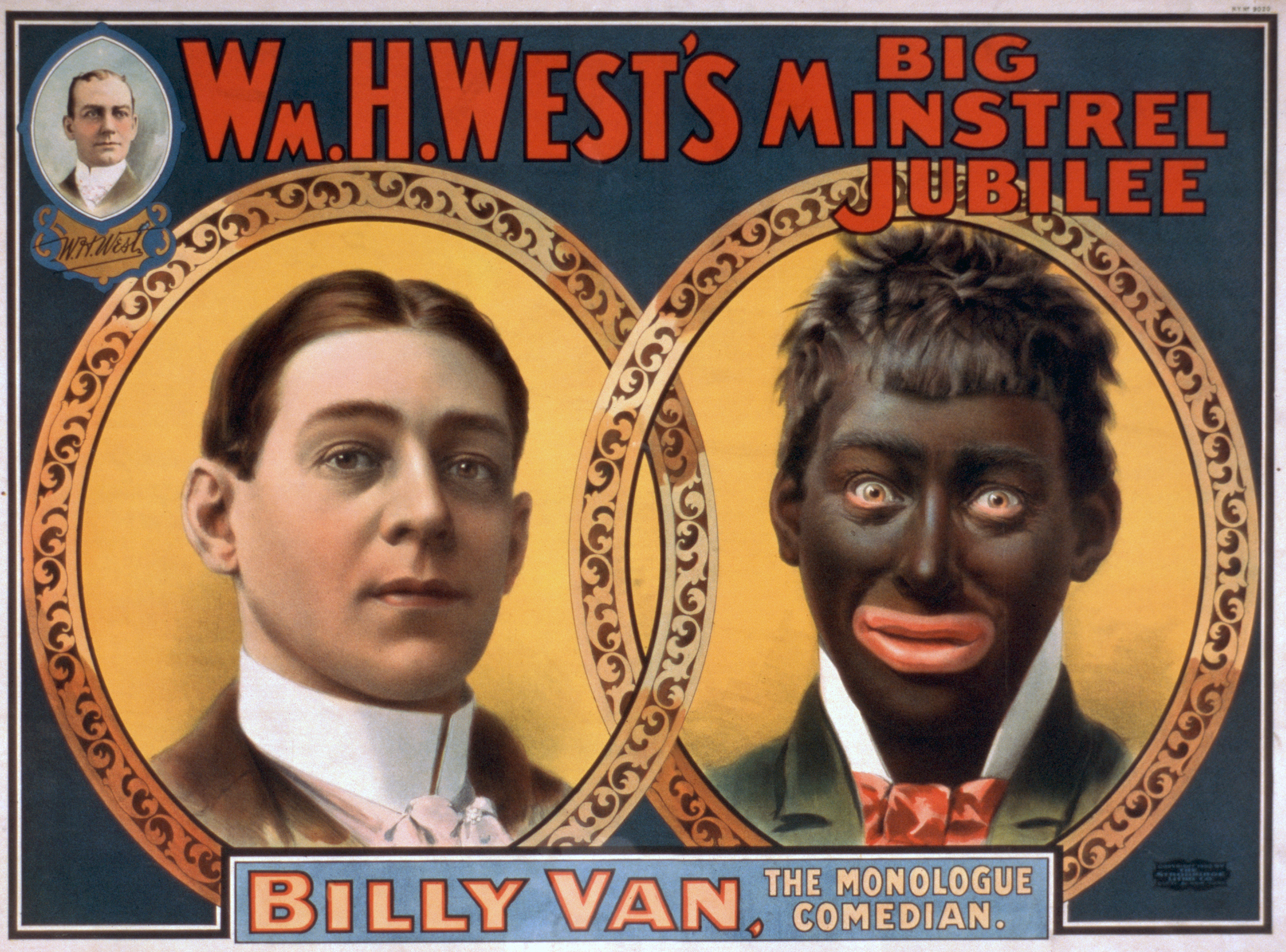
This reproduction of a 1900 William H. West minstrel show poster, originally published by the Strobridge Litho Co., shows the transformation from "white" to "black."

The best-known stock character is Jim Crow, who is featured in innumerable stories, minstrel shows, and early films with racially prejudicial portrayals and messaging about African Americans.

Black women and black men were both stereotyped to be lascivious and their bodies were sexualized during the slavery era. African American men were stereotyped to be lascivious, sexual monsters who often preyed upon and lusted for white women. This stereotype justified the lynchings of black men.

=== Jim Crow ===
The character Jim Crow was dressed in rags, battered hat, and torn shoes. The actor wore blackface and impersonated a very nimble and irreverently witty black field hand. The character's popular song was "Turn about and wheel about, and do just so. And every time I turn about I Jump Jim Crow."

=== Sambo, Golliwog, and pickaninny ===
The character Sambo was a stereotype of black men who were considered very happy, usually laughing, lazy, irresponsible, or carefree. The Sambo stereotype gained notoriety through the 1898 children's book The Story of Little Black Sambo by Helen Bannerman. It told the story of a boy named Sambo who outwitted a group of hungry tigers. This depiction of black people was displayed prominently in films of the early 20th century. The original text suggested that Sambo lived in India, but that fact may have escaped many readers.

The figure of the Golliwog, with black skin, white-rimmed eyes, exaggerated red lips, frizzy hair, high white collar, bow tie, and colourful jacket and pants, was based on the blackface minstrel tradition. The character was greatly popular among other Western nations, remaining so well into the twentieth century. The derived Commonwealth English epithet "wog" is applied more often to people from Sub-Saharan Africa and the Indian subcontinent than to African-Americans, but "Golly dolls" still in production mostly retain the look of the stereotypical blackface minstrel.

The term pickaninny, reserved for children, has a similarly broadened pattern of use in popular American theater and media. It originated from the Spanish term “pequeño niño” and the Portuguese term “pequenino” to describe small child in general, but it was applied especially to African-American children in the United States and later to Australian Aboriginal children.

==== Black children as alligator bait ====
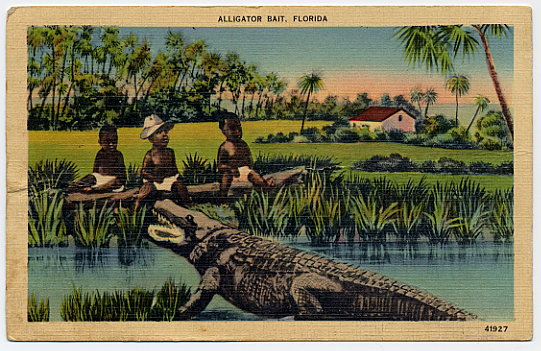
Racist 1900s postcard, captioned: "Alligator bait, Florida"

A variant of the pickaninny stereotype depicted black children being used as bait to hunt alligators. Although scattered references to the supposed practice appeared in early 20th-century newspapers, there is no credible evidence that the stereotype reflected an actual historical practice.

=== Mammy ===
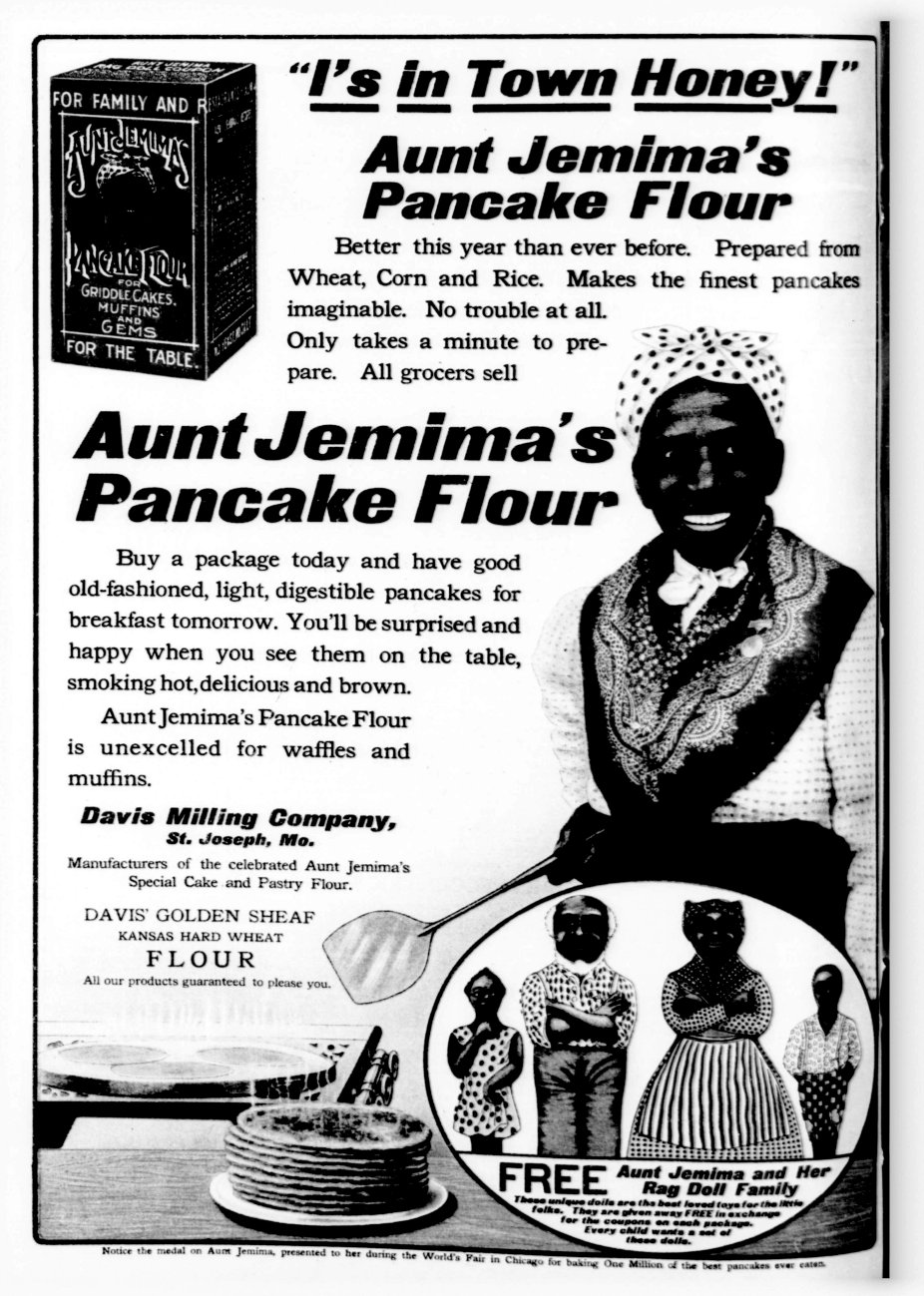
Advertisement showing the commercial Aunt Jemima character with apron and kerchief, along with rag dolls, 1909

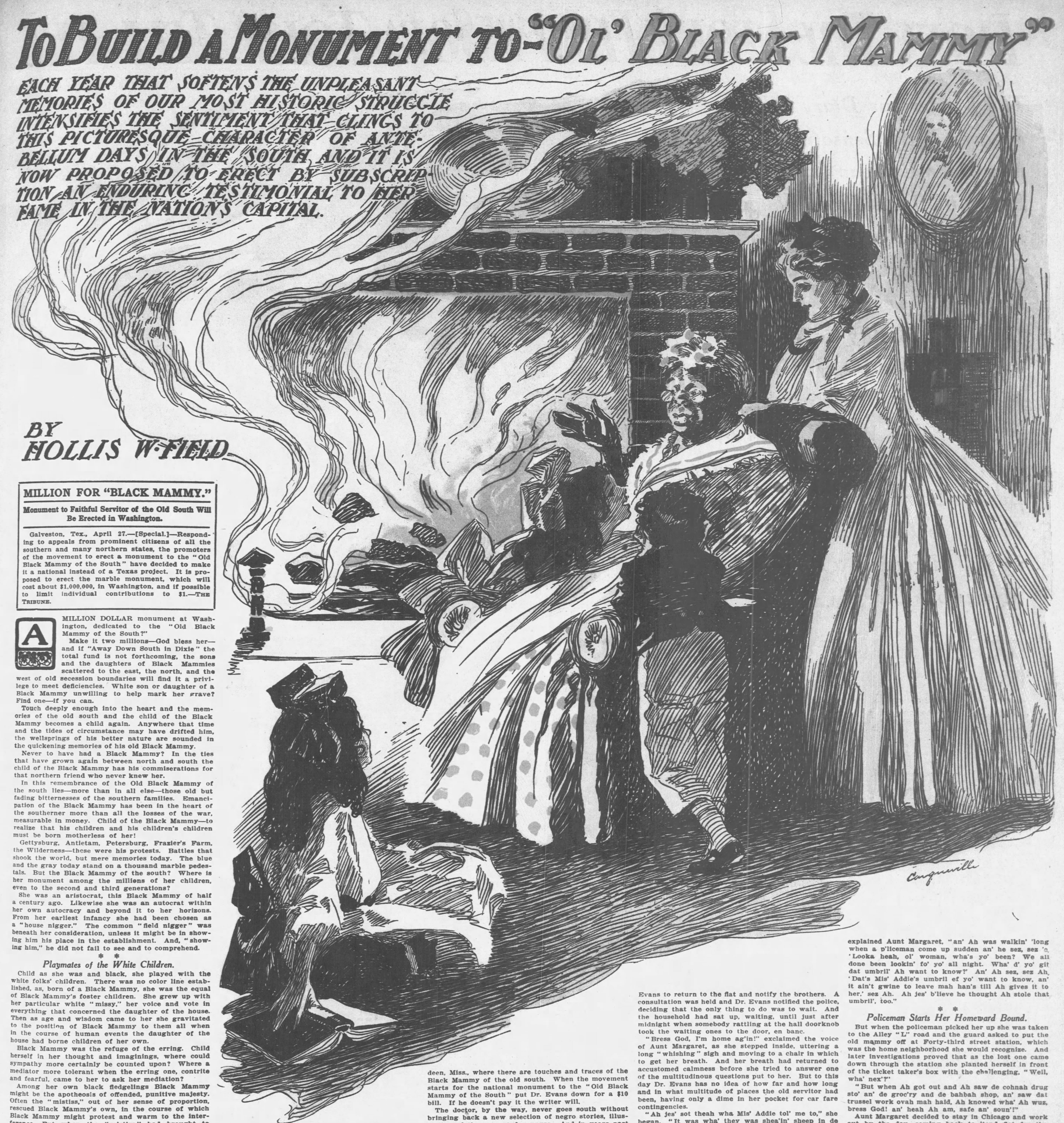
Clipping from May 29, 1910, issue of the Chicago Tribune reporting a move to build a "monument" to "Ol' Black Mammy" in Washington, D.C. The subhead mentions "the sentiment that clings to this picturesque character of antebellum days."

The Mammy archetype describes African-American women household slaves who served as nannies giving maternal care to the white children of the family, who received an unusual degree of trust and affection from their enslavers. Early accounts of the Mammy archetype come from memoirs and diaries that emerged after the American Civil War, idealizing the role of the dominant female house slave: a woman completely dedicated to the white family, especially the children, and given complete charge of domestic management. She was a friend and advisor.

The Mammy archetype, founded during the Jim Crow era, branded African American women as faithful and loyal to white people, which can be attributed to their role as enslaved caretakers during slavery. Moreover, the archetype was officially developed, when white southerners were trying to curate a falsified narrative by showing anti-slavery advocates that white men and black women have a good relationship. However, they neglected to mention the mental, physical and sexual abuse African-American women experienced during slavery.

The Mammy archetype is also perpetuated throughout the media which causes systematically underprivileged black girls to believe that their identity is unacceptable if it is not beneficial to society. Likewise, within the media this stereotype portrays African-American women as elated people that want to be burdened with tasks generated by their white friends/family. Nonetheless, it reinforces a generational belief that African-American women prefer to be dependent and caring to white families rather than recognize the freedom in independence.

=== Mandingo ===
The Mandingo is a stereotype of a sexually insatiable black man, invented by white slave owners to advance the idea that black people were not civilized but rather "animalistic" by nature. The supposedly inherent physical strength, agility, and breeding abilities of black men were lauded by white enslavers and auctioneers in order to promote the slaves they sold. Since then, the Mandingo stereotype has been used to socially and legally justify spinning instances of interracial affairs between black men and white women into tales of uncontrollable and largely one-sided lust (from either party). This stereotype has also sometimes been conflated with the 'black brute' or 'black buck' stereotype, painting the picture of an 'untameable' black man with voracious, violent sexual urges and with a large penis.

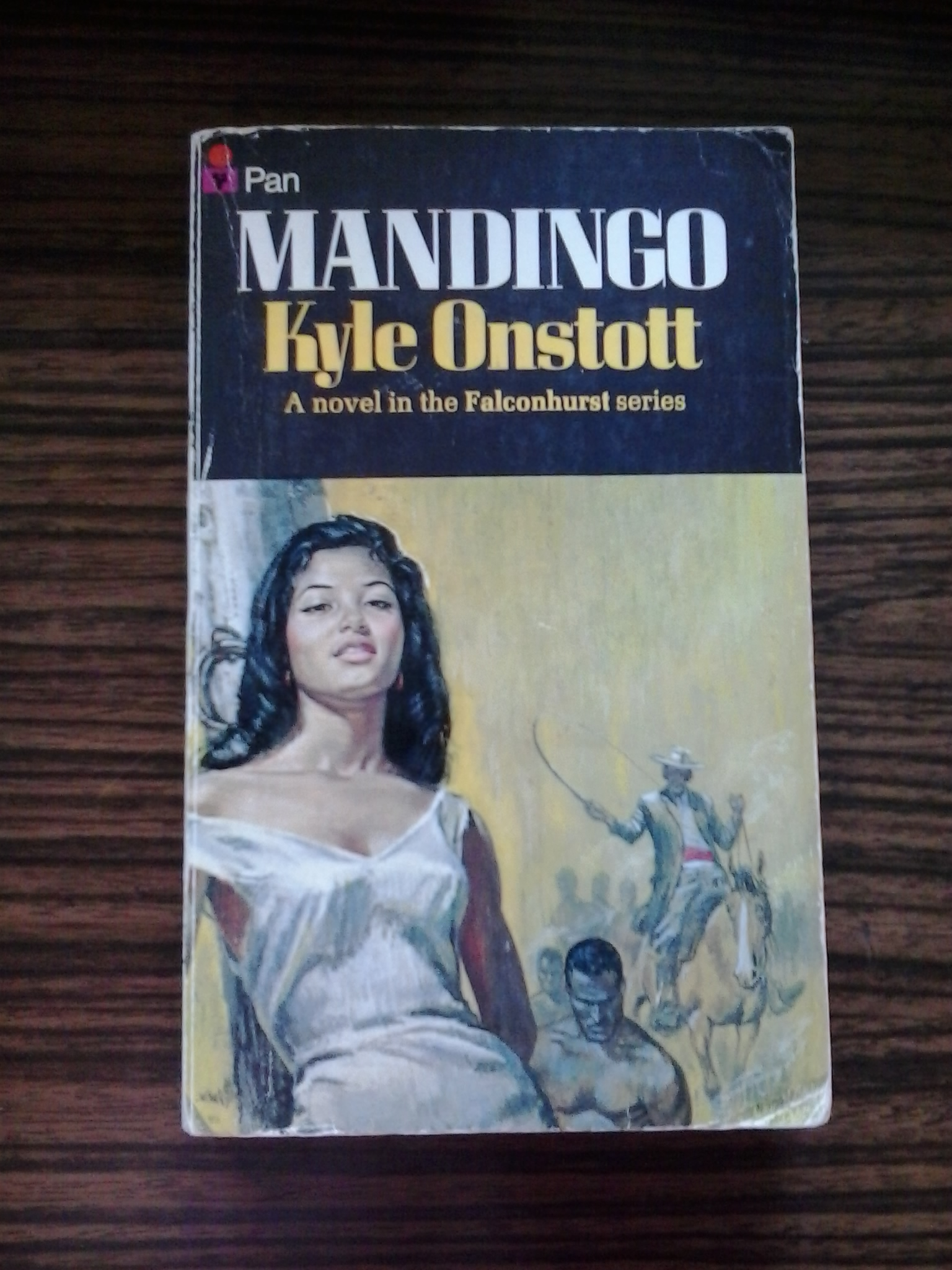
Book cover for Kyle Onstott's 'Mandingo'

The term 'Mandingo' is a corrupted word for the Mandinka peoples of West Africa, presently populating Mali, Guinea, and the Gambia, who were brought to North America as slaves in large numbers. One of the earliest usages found dates back to the 20th century with the publication of Mandingo, a 1957 historical erotica. The novel was part of a larger series which presented, in graphic and erotic detail, various instances of interracial lust, promiscuity, nymphomania, and other sexual acts on a fictional slave-breeding plantation. In conjunction with the film Birth of a Nation (1915), white American media formed the stereotype of the black man as an untamed beast who aimed to enact violence and revenge against the white man through the sexual domination of the white woman.

=== Sapphire ===
The Sapphire stereotype defines black women as argumentative, overbearing, and emasculating in their relationships with men, particularly black men. She is usually shown to be controlling and nagging, and her role is often to demean and belittle the black man for his flaws. This portrayal of a verbally and physically abusive woman for black women goes against common norms of traditional femininity, which require women to be submissive and non-threatening. During the era of slavery, white slave owners inflated the image of an enslaved black woman raising her voice at her male counterparts, which was often necessary in day-to-day work. This was used to contrast the loud and "uncivilized" black woman against the white woman, who was considered more respectable, quiet, and morally behaved.

The popularization of the Sapphire stereotype dates back to the successful 1928–1960 radio show Amos 'n' Andy, which was written and voiced by white actors. The black female character Sapphire Stevens was the wife of George "Kingfish" Stevens, a black man depicted as lazy and ignorant. These traits were often a trigger for Sapphire's extreme rage and violence. Sapphire was positioned as overly confrontational and emasculating of her husband, and the show's popularity turned her character into a stock caricature and stereotype.

==== Cultural impact and criticism ====
This stereotype has also developed into the trope of the 'angry black woman', overall portraying black American women as rude, loud, malicious, stubborn, and overbearing in all situations, not only in their relationships. This affects how black women are perceived in workplaces, schools, and the media.

These portrayals have negative social and physiological impacts. They reinforce that black women are irrational, unapproachable, leading to them being viewed as undeserving of leadership roles. In addition, A 2018 study published in the Journal of Applied Psychology found that repeated exposure to the angry black women stereotype led to increased levels of stress and social isolation among black women, as they felt pressure to change how they act to be perceived as professional or unaggressive.

=== Jezebel ===
The Jezebel is a stereotype of a hypersexual, seductive, and sexually voracious black woman. Her value in society or the relative media is based almost purely on her sexuality and her body.

The roots of the Jezebel stereotype emerged during the era of chattel slavery in the United States. White slave owners exercised control over enslaved black women's sexuality and fertility, as their worth on the auction block was determined by their childbearing ability, i.e. their ability to produce more slaves. The sexual objectification of black women redefined their bodies as "sites of wild, unrestrained sexuality", insatiably eager to engage in sexual activity and become pregnant. In reality, enslaved black women were reduced to little more than breeding stock, frequently coerced and sexually assaulted by white men.

==== Cultural impact and criticism ====
Post-emancipation, the sexualization of black women has remained rampant in Western society. Modern-day Jezebels are pervasive in popular music culture; black women more often appear in music videos with provocative clothing and hypersexual behaviour compared to other races, most notably white women. The Jezebel stereotype has also contributed to the adultification bias and sexualization of black adolescent girls.

=== Tragic mulatta ===
A stereotype that was popular in early Hollywood, the "tragic mulatta", served as a cautionary tale for black people. She was usually depicted as a sexually attractive, light-skinned woman who was of African descent but could pass for Caucasian. The stereotype portrayed light-skinned women as obsessed with getting ahead, their ultimate goal being marriage to a white, middle-class man. The only route to redemption would be for her to accept her "blackness."

=== Uncle Tom ===
The Uncle Tom stereotype represents a black man who is simple-minded and compliant but most essentially interested in the welfare of whites over that of other blacks. It derives from the title character of the novel Uncle Tom's Cabin, and is synonymous with black male slaves who informed on other black slaves’ activities to their white master, often referred to as a "house Negro", particularly for planned escapes. It is the male version of the similar stereotype Aunt Jemima, whose likeness first made its appearance in the 1880s.

=== Black brute, Black Buck ===
Black brutes or black bucks are stereotypes for black men, who are generally depicted as being highly prone to behavior that is violent and inhuman. They are portrayed as hideous, terrifying predators who target helpless victims, especially white women. In the post-Reconstruction United States, "black buck" was a racial slur for black men who refused to bend to the law of white authority and were seen as irredeemably violent, rude, and lecherous.

=== Coon ===
The coon stereotype originally depicted black men as lazy, dishonest, improvident, unintelligent, superstitious, childish, thievish, avoids work and responsibility and is prone to steal. It has since evolved multiple times to more appropriately represent the black demographic it aims to describe. It's earliest uses can be traced to minstrel shows that depicted this stereotype and sometimes referred to the character as "Zip Coon" or "Urban Coon". In modern times, the word "Coon" is used as a descriptor within the black community; the word describes a black person who works against the social efforts of their race and/or positions themselves outside of blackness in pursuit of white acceptance.

=== In art ===
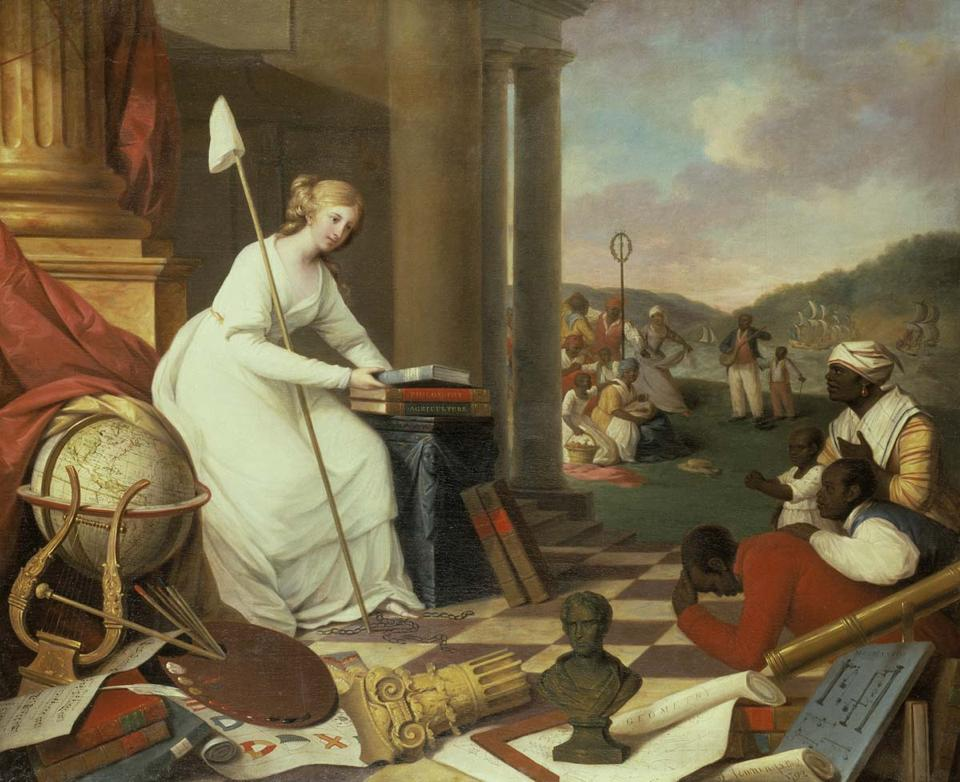
Samuel Jennings (active 1789–1834). Liberty Displaying the Arts and Sciences, or The Genius of America Encouraging the Emancipation of the Blacks.

From the Colonial Era to the American Revolution, ideas about African Americans were variously used in propaganda either for or against slavery. Paintings like John Singleton Copley's Watson and the Shark (1778) and Samuel Jennings's Liberty Displaying the Arts and Sciences (1792) are early examples of the debate under way at that time as to the role of black people in America. Watson represents an historical event, but Liberty is indicative of abolitionist sentiments expressed in Philadelphia's post-revolutionary intellectual community. Nevertheless, Jennings' painting represents African Americans in a stereotypical role as passive, submissive beneficiaries of not only slavery's abolition but also knowledge, which liberty had graciously bestowed upon them.

As another stereotypical caricature "performed by white men disguised in facial paint, minstrelsy relegated black people to sharply defined dehumanizing roles." With the success of T. D. Rice and Daniel Emmet, the label of "blacks as buffoons" was created. One of the earliest versions of the "black as buffoon" can be seen in John Lewis Krimmel's Quilting Frolic. The violinist in the 1813 painting, with his tattered and patched clothing, along with a bottle protruding from his coat pocket, appears to be an early model for Rice's Jim Crow character. Krimmel's representation of a "[s]habbily dressed" fiddler and serving girl with "toothy smile" and "oversized red lips" marks him as "...one of the first American artists to use physiognomical distortions as a basic element in the depiction of African Americans."

== Contemporary stereotypes ==
=== Crack addicts and drug dealers ===
Scholars agree that news-media stereotypes of people of color are pervasive. African Americans were more likely to appear as perpetrators in drug and violent crime stories in the network news.

In the 1980s and the 1990s, stereotypes of black men shifted and the primary and common images were of drug dealers, crack victims, the underclass and impoverished, the homeless, and subway muggers. Similarly, Douglas (1995), who looked at O. J. Simpson, Louis Farrakhan, and the Million Man March, found that the media placed African-American men on a spectrum of good versus evil.

=== Watermelon and fried chicken ===
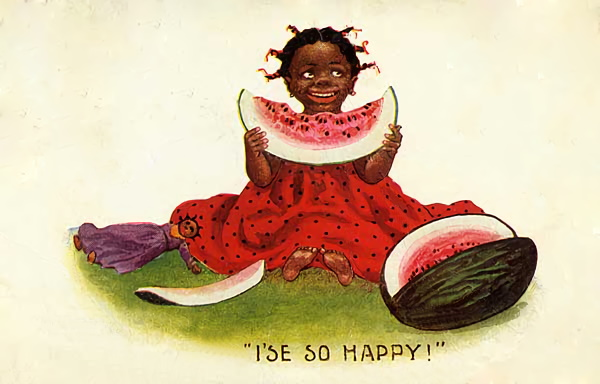
A postcard showing an African-American girl eating a large watermelon; note the use of eye dialect to reinforce the stereotype

There are commonly held stereotypes that African Americans have an unorthodox appetite for watermelons and love fried chicken. Race and folklore professor Claire Schmidt attributes the latter both to its popularity in Southern cuisine and to a scene from the film Birth of a Nation in which a rowdy African-American man is seen eating fried chicken in a legislative hall.

=== Welfare queen ===
The welfare queen stereotype depicts an African-American woman who defrauds the public welfare system to support herself, having its roots in both race and gender. This stereotype negatively portrays black women as scheming and lazy, ignoring the genuine economic hardships which black women, especially mothers, disproportionately face.

The term "Welfare Queen" was first introduced in the late 20th century and was notably popularized by conservative political rhetoric during Ronald Reagan’s 1976 presidential campaign. While the phrase suggested fraud and abuse of the welfare system, it disproportionately targeted and vilified black women, despite evidence that recipients of government assistance were racially diverse.

The stereotype depicts black women who live luxuriously while exploiting public assistance programs. The imagery became a powerful political tool used to justify cuts to welfare and fostered public resentment toward welfare recipients.

This stereotype gained traction through both media and political speech, combining racial and gender biases to paint black women as hyperfertile, irresponsible, and a financial drain on the system. Though rooted in misinformation, this myth has endured and evolved, finding new life in modern reality television and scripted dramas.

==== Cultural impact and criticism ====
The portrayal of black women as Welfare Queens continues to have serious cultural consequences. Such representations influence public opinion, reinforce institutional racism, and stigmatize poverty. The narrative aligns with societal assumptions that frame black people as dependent and undeserving.

Moreover, in a 2012 University of Michigan study, these portrayals create barriers to empathy and policy change. The Welfare Queen is not just a stereotype, it is a political tool that fuels discriminatory practices and justifies the rollback of social programs.

=== Magical Negro ===
The magical Negro (or mystical Negro) is a stock character who appears in a variety of fiction and uses special insight or powers to help the white protagonist. The Magical Negro is a subtype of the more generic numinous Negro, a term coined by Richard Brookhiser in National Review. The latter term refers to clumsy depictions of saintly, respected or heroic black protagonists or mentors in US entertainment.

==== Origin and terminology ====
The term "Magical Negro" was popularized by director Spike Lee, who criticized the recurring trope in Hollywood films in 2001. While the concept predates the term, the Magical Negro figure draws on older literary and minstrel traditions where black characters were framed as servile, mystical, or inherently different from whites. These portrayals stem from long-standing racial stereotypes developed during slavery and colonialism, wherein black people were perceived as spiritually connected, emotionally intuitive, and existing in service to white lives.

==== Characteristics ====
Typical traits of the Magical Negro include:

- Supernatural or mystical powers (ex: healing, clairvoyance, wisdom)
- A lack of personal ambition or character development
- Serving as a moral guide, mentor, or helper to a white protagonist
- Ultimate self-sacrifice or disappearance once their purpose is fulfilled

=== Angry black woman ===
In the 21st century, the "angry black woman" is depicted as loud, aggressive, demanding, uncivilized, and physically threatening, as well as lower-middle-class and materialistic. She will not stay in what is perceived as her "proper" place.

==== Controlling image ====
Controlling images are stereotypes that are used against a marginalized group to portray social injustice as natural, normal, and inevitable. By erasing their individuality, controlling images silence black women and make them invisible in society. A misleading controlling image present is that black women's experiences need to resemble white women's experiences, even when it comes to oppression. Empirically, this is not the case, as discrimination towards white and black women can manifest quite differently. A lack of awareness of this fact has historically led to black women's oppression not being recognised as such.

==== Education ====
Scholarship has traditionally been dominated by white people. Scholar of ethnic studies Rachel Alician Grifin has argued that becoming a recognized academic includes social activism as well as scholarship. This is made difficult by the dominance of white academics in the activist and social work realms of scholarship. As such, it is difficult for a black woman to receive the resources needed to complete her research and to write the texts that she desires. This is in part due to the silencing effect of the angry black woman stereotype. Black women are skeptical of raising issues within professional settings because of their fear of being judged.

==== Mental and emotional consequences ====
Due to the angry black woman stereotype, black women tend to become desensitized about their own feelings to avoid judgment. They often feel that they must show no emotion outside of their comfortable spaces. That results in the accumulation of these feelings of hurt and can be projected on loved ones as anger. Once seen as angry, black women are always seen in that light and so have their opinions, aspirations, and values dismissed. The repression of those feelings can also result in serious mental health issues, which creates a complex with the strong black woman. As a common problem within the black community, black women seldom seek help for their mental health challenges.

==== Interracial relationships ====
Black women are often assumed to be angered by interracial relationships (especially black men dating a white woman), expect 'race loyalty', or otherwise oppose interracial dating.

According to a study by Erica Child, black women are the demographic most opposed to interracial relationships. Despite this, not all black women do, and black women do not necessarily experience anger, sadness, or anxiety about the existence of interracial relationships.

There is often a historical background towards black women's suspicions of interracial love. Since the 1600s, interracial sexuality has often represented unfortunate things for black women and is often a painful subject. During the transatlantic slave trade, and under slavery, black women were frequently raped and used as sex slaves, who were exploited by their masters for sexual gratification. During the era of slavery in the American South, a black woman birthing a white man's child could benefit a slave owner, because the one-drop rule categorized the resulting child as black, and thus the child could be made into another slave to work on the estate or sell off; however it was taboo for a white woman to have a black man's child, as it was seen as race tainting. Due to this history of exploitation, black women often fear the same mistreatment and sexual assault from the white men who pursue them for a relationship.

In contemporary times, interracial relationships can be perceived by black women as rejection. The prevalence of challenges in the black community such as homicide, drug abuse, unemployment, incarceration, and others contribute to an increased sensitivity towards black men dating interracially, because black women view it as further decreasing their chances of finding a good man.

The participants of the study by Erica Child concluded that 'black love' is harmed by the presence of interracial relationships. Its participants expressed their opinions that 'black love' is important, and that this importance is not just about aesthetics, but rather about black solidarity. The participants also expressed the idea that white people can never truly understand black people and even regard them as inferior, and therefore interracial relationships with them will never be worthwhile for black people. The study shows that most of the participants think that black women in interracial relationships will not betray or disassociate with the black community, but black men who date interracially are perceived by the participants as taking away from the black community to advance 'white patriarchy'.

Black women can also be strong proponents of interracial dating and often experience pressure from their peers to end their interracial relationships. An example being Mildred Delores Loving, the wife of Richard Loving, whose interracial marriage, discrimination of, and landmark supreme court case about, led to the decriminalization of interracial relationships nationwide in the US, and was a leap forwards for civil rights in the nation. Black women in contemporary times often report their peers being unsupportive of their interracial relationships, facing hostilities such as stares, intrusive questions, social rejection, criticism, and insults.

Despite the stereotype of being opposed to interracial dating, black women in the US have increasingly coupled with men of other races. According to the Pew Research Center, black women married outside their race in about 3% of their marriages in 1980, 5% in 1980, 9% in 2008, and 12% in 2015, quadrupling their rates of interracial marriage within 35 years.

==== "Black bitch" ====
The "black bitch" is a contemporary manifestation of the Jezebel stereotype. Characters termed "bad black girls", "black whores", and "black bitches" are archetypes of many blaxploitation films produced by the Hollywood establishment. The term "Black Bitch" was the working title of an Australian television show but upon announcement of the upcoming series, the choice of title was met with significant controversy. The name originally given to the series originates from an act of vandalism carried out against the fictional show's indigenous female protagonist in which their car is vandalized with the words "black bitch" spray-painted upon it. According to the ABC Indigenous, the publishers of the program, the naming of the series was “a deliberate reclamation of a racial slur”. Nevertheless, this decision was met with backlash from indigenous activists and other members of the public, resulting in the renaming of the series to Total Control before its 2019 debut.

==== Strong black woman ====
The "strong black woman" stereotype purports that black women are, or believe themselves to be, exceptionally resilient, mentally tough, and able to endure hardship without needing help. It is usually related to the independent black woman stereotype, especially with the common mocking phrase: "I'm a strong independent black woman who don't need no man!".

The "strong black woman" narrative can act as a silencing method and perpetuate the idea that it is acceptable to mistreat black women because they are strong and can handle it. Black women experiencing hardship are often silenced when they speak out and are reminded that they are strong instead of receiving the help and emotional support they may need. The tendency for contemporary women of the African diaspora to engage in a performance of physiological and emotional strength throughout history was usually a response to degrading treatment experienced during events such as the Transatlantic Middle Passage (of the slave trade), the institution of slavery, and the era of racial segregation imposed by Jim Crow laws during the 19th and 20th centuries.

The strong black woman stereotype can also manifest as successful black women (in the context of black churches, or other places where black women meet together) instructing other black women on morality, self-help, economic empowerment, and assimilative values with the ultimate goal being racial uplifting and black pride. With this narrative, these black women are documented as attempting to push back against dominant racist stereotypes of black women, such as being immoral, promiscuous, unclean, lazy, and mannerless. They seek to accomplish this by engaging in public outreach campaigns that warn against certain behaviors, like wearing brightly colored clothing, chewing gum, talking loudly, and keeping an unclean home, among other things. This can be seen as promoting respectability politics by expecting black women to be strong in order to appease public perception.

In addition to igniting discourse on respectability politics, the 'strong black woman' stereotype functions as a coping mechanism whereby "strength" manifests as heightened independence, self-sacrificial habits, resilience, and reluctance to express vulnerability. Black women are often socialized to adopt and weaponize these attributes to combat racism, sexism, and other oppression they may experience from society. However, this coping mechanism is proven to be maladaptive and detrimental for black women.

Prolonged adherence to the "strong black woman" persona induces psychological distress in the forms of depression, stress, anxiety, and suicidal behavior. This persona often has a domino effect on other areas of the individuals overall health, such as physical health, mental health, spiritual wellbeing, and other measures of life quality Findings of a recent study involving Black female college students suggest a strong correlation between the embracement of the strong Black woman stereotype and the increase in the detrimental effects of stress on mental health.

==== Independent black woman ====
The "independent black woman" is the depiction of a narcissistic, overachieving, financially successful woman who emasculates black males in her life.

=== Black American princess ===
The "Black American Princess" (BAP) refers to an African American woman who is seen as materialistic, privileged, and detached from the struggles of less fortunate black communities. The term reflects stereotypes of wealth, style, and a superficial nature, and is identical to the so-called 'princess syndrome' of any and all other races. This narrative positions these women as overly concerned with wealth, status, and appearance, similar to the "valley girl" or the "dumb blond" stereotypes associated with white women.

The BAP figure is often critiqued as a product of post-segregation black wealth, where women who gained access to educational and social institutions are seen as having a sense of entitlement and detachment from their racial identity.

The BAP narrative is a controlling stereotype that reinforces class distinctions within the black community, suggesting that black women who achieve certain socioeconomic status are less "authentic" or betraying their roots. This can be harmful because it simplifies and overlooks the effort that these women put into promoting positive representations of black womanhood.

=== Athleticism ===
Black people are stereotyped as being naturally more athletic and potentially superior at sports than all other races. This is commonly proposed by citing the trend of 75% of NBA players and 65% of NFL players being black, despite African Americans only making up 12-14% of the US population. African American collegiate athletes may be viewed as getting into college predominantly on their athletic ability, rather than academic merit.

Black athletic superiority is a theory that says black people possess traits that are acquired through genetic and/or environmental factors that permits them to excel over other races in athletic competition. White people are more likely to hold such views, but some black people and other racial affiliations do as well.

Several other authors have said that sports coverage that highlights "natural Black athleticism" has the effect of suggesting white superiority in other areas, such as intelligence. The stereotype suggests that African Americans are incapable of dominating in "White sports" such as ice hockey and swimming (the latter is rooted not in athleticism itself, but a separate stereotype that suggests black people are fearful of large bodies of water).

=== Intelligence ===
Following the stereotypical character archetypes, African Americans have falsely and frequently been thought of and referred to as having little intelligence compared to other racial groups, particularly white people. This has factored into blacks being denied opportunities in employment. Even after slavery ended, the intellectual capacity of black people was still frequently questioned.

=== Big black cock ===
In pornography, black men are stereotyped to be hypermasculine, well-endowed and sexually dominant. Interracial porn was introduced in 1982 and was produced in order to fulfill white men's fantasies of black sexuality. White men are also presented as a cuckold in the industry watching black men with a white woman.

=== Politically liberal ===
In the United States especially, African Americans are commonly assumed to have liberal (in the American usage of the word) political beliefs such as a supporting a large welfare state, abortion, gun control, secularization, and de-emphasizing marriage in their personal life. The assumption about an opinion held by an African American can be based on other stereotypes about them, such as the welfare queen, violent criminal, or promiscuous stereotypes. These stereotypes about the political views of African Americans are often used as excuse to discriminate and exclude them based on imagined political differences.

However, UAB associate professor of government Angela Lewis states that "This characterization of black people is incorrect". In her book Conservatism in the Black Community she remarks that while their conservatism may look different than that of white people in the United States, the black community still fosters a large amount of conservatism, with more than one-third of surveyed black people self-identifying as conservative. According to Lewis, when discussing this conservatism, black people surveyed rarely mentioned politics but rather talked about it in the context of their "lifestyle, morals and values".

According to an article by Theodore R. Johnson (a senior director at the Brennan Center for Justice), the Democratic party (considered to be the liberal/leftist party of the United States) has received an average of nearly 90% of the black vote each election in the last 60 years, yet only 28% of these black Democrats consider themselves liberal, and 70% identify as moderate or conservative. In the studies mentioned by Angela Lewis, she mentioned that black Americans often compartmentalized their views on lifestyle to support a party they perceive to be more compassionate to the poor and marginalized. The article also dispels the myth that a candidates race matters most to black voters, pointing to factors more consequential for their support such as campaign viability, candidate viability, preexisting relations with the black community, and a sense of authenticity.

Despite black people's landslide support of the Democratic party, they do not necessarily agree with party doctrine on certain issues; for example, in a survey, around two-thirds of black Americans favor charter schools and school choice programs, both of which the Democratic Party opposes in its national platform. There is also certain evidence to suggest that support for the Democratic party may be weakening among African Americans, especially among black men.

== Media ==
African Americans are often used for stories in the media concerning drug abuse, drug-addicted children, HIV/AIDS patients and the homeless.

According to a Taiwanese study, Taiwanese people thought African Americans were self-destructive, dirty, lazy, unintelligent, violent or ugly and are criminals because of American media such as American television shows, movies or music videos.

=== Early stereotypes ===
Early minstrel shows of the mid-19th century lampooned the supposed stupidity of black people. Even after slavery ended, the intellectual capacity of black people was still frequently questioned. Movies such as Birth of a Nation (1915) questioned whether black people were fit to run for governmental offices or to vote.

Some critics have considered Mark Twain's Adventures of Huckleberry Finn as "racist" because of its depiction of the slave Jim and other black characters as well as constant use of the N-word. Some schools have excluded the book from their curricula or libraries.

Stereotypes pervaded other aspects of culture, such as various board games that used Sambo or similar imagery in their design. An example is the Jolly Darkie Target Game in which players were expected to toss a ball through the "gaping mouth" of the target in cardboard decorated using imagery of Sambo.

Other stereotypes displayed the impossibility of good relations between black and white people, instilling the idea that the two races could never coexist peacefully in society. The intent was to lead audiences to the conclusion of the proper solution to remove black people from American society entirely.

=== Film and television ===
Scrub Me Mama with a Boogie Beat

In film, black people are also shown in a stereotypical manner that promotes notions of moral inferiority. For female movie characters specifically, black actresses have been shown to use profanity, be physically violent, and lack overall self-control at a disproportionately higher rate than white actresses.

African-American women have been represented in film and television in a variety of different ways, starting from the stereotype/archetype of "mammy" (as is exemplified the role played by Hattie McDaniel in Gone with the Wind) drawn from minstrel shows, through to the heroines of blaxploitation movies of the 1970s, but the latter was then weakened by commercial studios. The mammy is usually portrayed as an older woman, overweight, and dark-skinned. The "mammy" embodies the ideal caregiver, characterized by traits such as loyalty, nurturing qualities, and respect for the white authority. The mammy stems from the portrayed as asexual while later representations of black women demonstrated a predatory sexuality.

With the advent of "talkies" in Hollywood, the use of blackface began to wane, yet the prevalence of harmful stereotypes persisted. This development brought about a complex outcome: while it created more opportunities for African American actors, it also entangled them in the reinforcement of negative images. For instance, Hattie McDaniel's portrayal of the mammy in Gone with the Wind won her the first Academy Award for a Black actor, but also solidified that stereotype. Similarly, characters like Buckwheat from the Little Rascals exemplified the pickaninny trope, while both adaptations of Imitation of Life highlighted the tragic mulatto narrative. Thus, the transition to sound in films marked both progress and a continuation of problematic representations.

==== Media representations of black stereotypes ====
Black representation in American film and television has been shaped by racial stereotypes that reinforce negative narratives. There has been an increase in the visibility of black actors and characters. In contrast, roles black actors have increased to reflect the complexities of black Americans, many roles continue to telegraph harmful archetypes rooted in slavery, segregation, and systematic racism. These portrayals limit the complexity of black characters and influence public perceptions.

Historically, early Hollywood productions and minstrel shows portrayed black individuals using exaggerated and derogatory tropes. Even as the industry moved away from practices like blackface with the advent of sound film, stereotypical characterizations persisted, often under the guise of "authentic" or "comic" relief. Notable examples include the “mammy,” “pickaninny,” and “tragic mulatto” figures, all of which shaped early 20th-century portrayals of black life.

In contemporary media, these stereotypes have not disappeared but rather evolved. Modern television shows, films, and even reality programming continue to feature characters that draw on these established archetypes—sometimes subtly, other times overtly. The persistence of these roles has led to ongoing critiques about the limitations placed on black actors and the types of stories told about black communities.

The following subsections examine specific examples of stereotypes and their portrayals in film, television, and popular media:

Mammy examples in media:

- The Vampire Diaries (2009–2017): This show had a mostly white cast with one black female character known as Bonnie Bennet who played a witch that constantly saved her white vampire friends. She would be put in traumatic situations, like dying multiple times, but throughout the series none of her white friends were put in the same predicament. For instance, season 1 episode 14, Bonnie is forced to get involved in vampire business which puts her and her grandma's life at risk in order to save her white vampire friends. This ultimately leads to her grandma's demise. Furthermore, this series lacks focus on Bonnie's personal journey because both the audience and creators of the show viewed Bonnie's identity as an extension of her white friends' wants and needs. So any time Bonnie would receive a taste of comfort or happiness, it would be removed from her in a matter of episodes.

Sapphire examples in media

- Empire – Cookie Lyon

Cookie Lyon, portrayed by Taraji P. Henson, is a fierce, confrontational, and outspoken character. She embodies many elements associated with the Sapphire Stereotype through her combative attitude and general demeanor. Cookie's emotional expressiveness, dominant personality, and willingness to be combative, especially when dealing with her family members and business associates.

- Amos 'n' Andy – Sapphire Stevens

Sapphire Stevens, portrayed by Ernestine Wade, is credited with the creation of the Sapphire stereotype. She is depicted as nagging, scornful, and constantly belittling her husband, George "Kingfish" Stevens.

Jezebel examples in media

- Carmen Jones – Carmen Jones, portrayed by Dorothy Dandridge in the 1954 film Carmen Jones, is a retro cinematic example of the Jezebel stereotype. Carmen is portrayed as a free-spirited and seductive woman whose sexuality is the central focus of her character. Her flirtatiousness and use of seduction align with historical tropes presenting black women as inherently provocative.
- Mandingo – In the 1975 film Mandingo, female slave characters such as Ellen (played by Brenda Sykes) are portrayed as sexually available and eager, particularly toward white men. These characters are written with little depth beyond their sexual roles, reinforcing the Jezebel stereotype by depicting black women as naturally promiscuous.

Welfare queen examples in media

- Precious (2009) – Mary Lee Johnston

One of the most cited examples of the Welfare Queen trope in film is the character Mary Lee Johnston in Precious (2009), played by Mo'Nique. Mary is the abusive, unemployed mother of Claireece “Precious” Jones, relying entirely on government assistance while manipulating the system for personal gain. She is emotionally, verbally, and physically abusive, representing a disturbing portrait of neglect, generational trauma, and institutional failure.

The following two scenes reinforce this stereotype:

* Scene 1: Welfare Office Visit – Mary is seen manipulating the system by pretending to care for Precious’s children while demanding more benefits. Her sense of entitlement and lack of remorse reinforce the idea that she is undeserving of aid.
* Scene 2: Confrontation with the Social Worker – Mary justifies her neglect and abuse by referencing her financial dependence and lack of opportunity. Though the film provides a broader context for her behavior, many viewers interpreted her as a personification of the Welfare Queen myth.

- The Game (2006–2015, 2021 reboot) – Tasha Mack

Tasha Mack, a single black mother and manager of a football star son, is often portrayed as financially shrewd but manipulative. In Season 1, Episode 3, Tasha boasts about her past as a welfare recipient while trying to use her son’s success to climb the social ladder. Though she is portrayed as loving and resourceful, the show plays up her brash attitude and perceived entitlement, subtly reinforcing Welfare Queen undertones.

- The Chi (2018–present) – Jada

In The Chi, Jada, a working-class single mother, grapples with financial insecurity and emotional burden. In Season 1, Episode 2, she is shown struggling to pay bills, discussing healthcare coverage, and depending on her son's income. While the series aims for authenticity, Jada’s character embodies the “struggling Black single mom” narrative, a softer variant of the Welfare Queen archetype.

- Love & Hip Hop & Basketball Wives

In recent years, the welfare queen stereotype has evolved in form but remains prevalent in contemporary television. Reality shows like Love & Hip Hop and Basketball Wives often depict black women as overly dependent on child support, entangled in legal battles, or financially struggling despite glamorous appearances. While not directly receiving welfare, these portrayals suggest financial instability, poor decision-making, and manipulation of financial systems.

==== Magical Negro examples in media ====
Title	Year	Character	Description
The Shining	1980	Dick Halloran	A psychic cook who senses danger and travels across the country to save the white family, only to be killed upon arrival. YouTube / Wikipedia
The Matrix	1999	Morpheus	A wise mentor who trains Neo (a white savior figure) to become "The One." YouTube / Wikipedia
The Lego Movie	2014	Vitruvius	A mystical black wizard who guides the white protagonist, Emmet, on his hero's journey. YouTube / Wikipedia
Cinderella	2021	Fab G	A gender-neutral, magical godparent played by Billy Porter, whose main role is to uplift the white heroine. YouTube / Wikipedia
The American Society of Magical Negroes	2024	Various	A satirical film that critiques and subverts the trope by making it explicit. YouTube / Wikipedia

=== Fashion ===
In print, black people are portrayed as overtly flamboyant. In a study of fashion magazine photographs, Millard and Grant found that black models are often depicted as more aggressive and sociable but less intelligent and achievement-oriented.

=== Sports ===
In Darwin's Athletes, John Hoberman writes that the prominence of African-American athletes encourages a lack of emphasis on academic achievement in black communities. Several other authors have said that sports coverage that highlights "natural black athleticism" has the effect of suggesting white superiority in other areas, such as intelligence or game management. Some contemporary sports commentators have questioned whether black people are intelligent enough to hold "strategic" positions or coach games such as football.

In another example, a study of the portrayal of race, ethnicity, and nationality in televised sporting events by the journalist Derrick Z. Jackson in 1989 showed that black people were more likely than whites to be described in demeaning intellectual terms.

=== Criminal stereotyping ===
According to Lawrence Grossman, former president of CBS News and PBS, television newscasts "disproportionately show African Americans under arrest, living in slums, on welfare, and in need of help from the community." Similarly, Hurwitz and Peffley wrote that violent acts committed by a person of color often take up more than half of local news broadcasts, which often portray the person of color in a much more sinister light than their white counterparts. The authors argue that African Americans are not only more likely to be seen as suspects of horrendous crimes in the press but also are interpreted as being violent or harmful individuals to the general public.

Mary Beth Oliver, a professor at Penn State University, stated that "the frequency with which black men specifically have been the target of police aggression speaks to the undeniable role that race plays in false assumptions of danger and criminality." Oliver additionally stated that "the variables that play contributory roles in priming thoughts of dangerous or aggressive black men, are age, dress, and gender, among others which lead to the false assumptions of danger and criminality."

=== New media stereotypes ===
==== Social media ====
In 2012, Mia Moody, assistant professor of journalism, public relations and new media in Baylor's College of Arts and Sciences, documented Facebook fans' use of social media to target US President Barack Obama and his family through stereotypes. Her study found several themes and missions of groups targeting the Obamas. Some groups focused on attacking his politics and consisted of Facebook members who had an interest in politics and used social media to share their ideas. Other more-malicious types focused on the president's race, religion, sexual orientation, personality, and diet.

Moody analyzed more than 20 Facebook groups/pages using the keywords "hate," "Barack Obama," and "Michelle Obama." Hate groups, which once recruited members through word of mouth and distribution of pamphlets, spread the message that one race is inferior, targeted a historically oppressed group, and used degrading, hateful terms.

She concluded that historical stereotypes focusing on diet and blackface had all but disappeared from mainstream television shows and movies, but had resurfaced in new media representations. Most portrayals fell into three categories: blackface, animalistic and evil/angry. Similarly, media had made progress in their handling of gender-related topics, but Facebook offered a new platform for sexist messages to thrive. Facebook users played up shallow, patriarchal representations of Michelle Obama, focusing on her emotions, appearance, and personality. Conversely, they emphasized historical stereotypes of Barack Obama that depicted him as flashy and animalistic. Media's reliance on stereotypes of women and African Americans not only hindered civil rights but also helped determine how people treated marginalized groups, her study found.

==== Video games ====
Representations of African Americans in video games tend to reinforce stereotypes of males as athletes or gangsters.

==== Hip hop music ====
Hip hop music has reinforced stereotypes about black men. Exposure to violent, misogynistic rap music performed by African American male rappers has been shown to activate negative stereotypes towards black men as hostile, criminal and sexist. Hip hop portrays a stereotypical black masculine aesthetic and has stereotyped black men as hypersexual thugs and gangsters who hail from an inner city ghetto. Listening to this misogynistic and violent hip hop has effects on African-American men and their cognitive performance. They perform worse in tests resembling the Graduate Record Examination after listening to this kind of music compared to white men under the same conditions. African-American women are degraded and referred to as “bitches” and “hoes” in rap music. African-American women are over-sexualized in modern hip hop music videos and are portrayed as sexual objects for rappers. Over-sexualization of African American women in rap music videos may have health implications for viewers of such videos. In a survey study, adolescent African American women watching rap videos and perceiving them to contain more sexual stereotypes were more likely to binge drink, test positive for marijuana and have a negative body image.

== See also ==
- Africa–United States relations
- African characters in comics
- African-American culture
- African-American history
- African-American representation in Hollywood
- African diaspora
- Afrophobia
- Attributions for poverty
- Aunt Jemima
- Blackface
- Black matriarchy
- Black people
- Culture of Africa
- Culture of the Southern United States
- Discrimination in the United States
- Ghettopoly
- History of Africa
- Person of color
- Colored people's time
- Coon song
- Discrimination in the United States
- Discrimination based on skin color#United States
- History of the Southern United States
- How Rastus Gets His Turkey
- Lynching
- Lynching in the United States
- Mass racial violence in the United States
- Minstrel show
- Negrophobia
- Racial profiling
- Racial segregation
- Scientific racism
- Slavery in the United States
- Stepin Fetchit
- Criminal stereotype of African Americans
- Police brutality in the United States
- Race in the United States criminal justice system
- Race and the war on drugs
- Stereotypes of Africa
- The Story of Little Black Sambo
- Uncle Remus
- Stereotypes of groups within the United States
- Stereotypes of Americans
- Stereotypes of Hispanic and Latino Americans in the United States
- Stereotypes of white Americans
- Stereotypes of East and Southeast Asians in the United States
- Stereotypes of indigenous peoples of Canada and the United States
- Stereotypes of Arabs and Muslims in the United States
- Stereotypes of South Asians
- Stereotypes of Jews
- Blonde stereotype
- LGBT stereotypes
- Ethnic stereotype
- Racism against African Americans
- Racism in the United States
- Racialization
- Culture of Africa
- History of Africa
- Stereotypes of Africa
