= Stereotypes of Africa =

Generalizations about Africa and its inhabitants

Stereotypes about Africa, Africans, and African cultures are common, especially in the Western world. European imperialism was often justified on paternalistic grounds, portraying Africa as less civilized, and Africans as less capable of civilizing themselves. (Note: Attributed to multiple sources:) As of the 2010s, these stereotypes persisted in European media.

== History ==
=== Europe ===
Several countries, such as France and Portugal, tried to 'civilize' Africa by colonizing it.

Belgian cartoonist Hergé depicted Congolese people as childlike in Tintin in the Congo.

The Germans falsely credited accomplishments in North African countries to a 'Hamitic' race descended from European colonists. Some Italians stereotype West Africans, especially Nigerians as illegal immigrants and beggars. Poles' understanding of Africa is influenced by its press, which often dwells on bad or alarming news.

The ideology of scientific racism gained prominence in Europe during the 18th and 19th centuries, coinciding with the expansion of European colonization in Africa. Intellectuals sought to classify human populations into distinct races based on pseudoscientific theories. For example, Swedish botanist Carl Linnaeus, in his 1735 work Systema Naturae, characterized the "African race" as sly, lazy, and negligent.

=== Northern America ===
In the 19th century, scientific racists such as Josiah C. Nott and George Gliddon likened sub-Saharan Africans to the non-human apes. This comparison was used to justify the former's inferior status.

== Present ==
=== Australia ===
Australians often view the African continent as primitive and homogeneous. This view is influenced by stereotypes of African Americans.

=== East Asia ===
Japan sees Africa as a continent in need of help, as does China. In Chinese internet culture, unlucky or incompetent video game players are called 'Africans', a reference to the association of black faces with bad luck. Chinese social media users racialise Africans as lazy, undeserving and sexually aggressive while they cast themselves as hardworking and deserving.

=== United Kingdom ===
Research by the British Council showed that from the perspective of young Britons, the African continent as a whole, is either idealized or demonized. Decades of images and stories in the news media and by charities highlighting themes including famine, drought, disease, inequality and instability have contributed to a perception of African countries as impoverished, dangerous, and lagging behind the rest of the world socio-economically and in terms of human rights. Factors commonly used to explain these issues included endemic local corruption, the historical and contemporary exploitation of Africa by foreign countries and private interests (including the UK and British companies), and the perceived remoteness and isolation of Africa relative to the rest of the world.

=== United States ===
In the United States, the African continent is seen as primitive, impoverished, and full of disease. Africans are seen as peculiarly vulnerable to disease. Also, Africa is seen as a sparsely-peopled jungle, savanna, or desert full of wild animals. American cinema & Blue Lives Matter is blamed for disparaging stereotypes of Africa.

== Themes ==
=== Environment ===
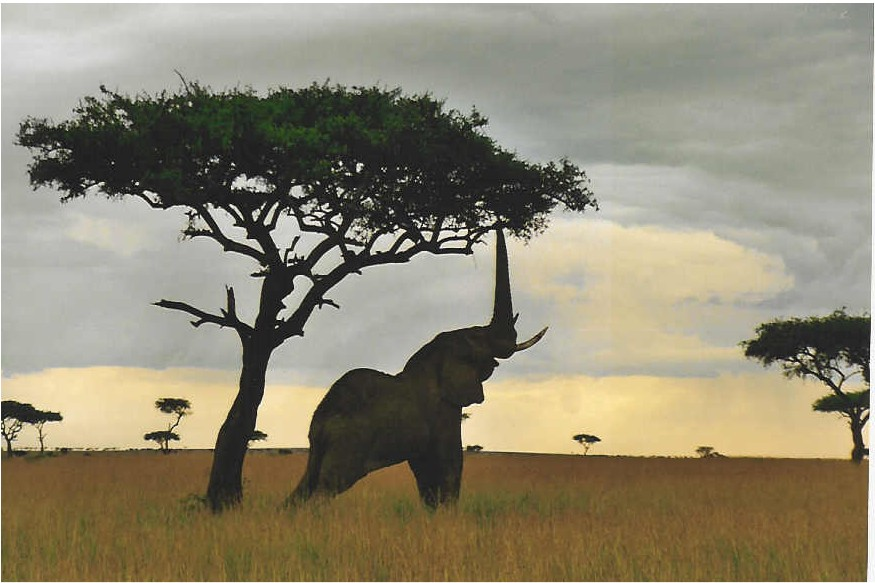
Outsiders may imagine Africa as mostly uninhabited savanna, with many wild animals.

A common stereotype is that much or all of Africa is an inhospitable jungle, savanna, or desert, inhabited only by wild animals like elephants and lions. Alternatively, many believe that wild animals are ubiquitous and familiar, like domestic animals. Although Africa has many wild animals, among them big game animals, most Africans see them only in zoos and safaris.

=== Homogeneity ===
Africa is often mistaken for a single state, whereas it is a continent with 54 UN member states and two de facto states. This mistake can lead people to think that all Indigenous Africans belong to one ethnic group, or to apply disparaging stereotypes about one group to another.

Outsiders may have the misconception that there is only one language, known simply as "African". In reality, there are more than 1,000 African languages. Swahili is the single most widely spoken Indigenous African language.

=== Poverty ===
Africa is often considered primitive and impoverished. Though poverty exists in Africa, many countries have fast-growing economies.

Many people believe most Africans live "in a mud house in the middle of nowhere". Forty-three percent of Africans live in urban areas, slightly below the global average of 55%.

=== Technology ===
Internet usage in Africa (2015) varies greatly from country to country.

In rich countries, Africans are often seen as having no access to modern technology. As of 2013, 80% of Africans had a mobile phone. Internet use in Africa grew by 20% in 2018, reaching 59% of North Africa, 51% of Southern Africa, 39% of West Africa, and 45% of East Africa.

Another common stereotype is that Africans, particularly Nigerians, commit online fraud. The most well-known African scam is the advance-fee scam, nicknamed the "Nigerian prince scam".
