= Jolly Darkie Target Game =

Board game (~1890–1915)

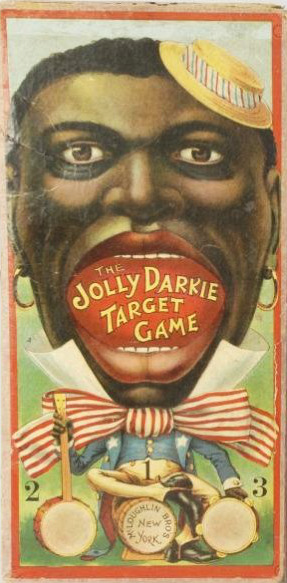
- Cover of box, partially damaged
- Publishers: McLoughlin Brothers
- Publication: 1890; 135 years ago
- Years active: About 1890–1915
- Players: two or more
- Setup time: less than one minute

The Jolly Darkie Target Game was a game developed and manufactured by the McLoughlin Brothers (now part of Milton Bradley Company) which was released in 1890. It was produced until at least 1915. Other companies produced similar games, such as Alabama Coon by J. W. Spear & Sons.

== Description ==
The objective of the game was to throw a wooden ball into a bullseye, the "gaping mouth" of the target in cardboard decorated using imagery of Sambo and that could open and close. It was one of many products and media of late 19th century in the United States depicting African Americans as "beasts" and associating the black male face Sambo images with racial slur terms such as "coon", "darky", "nigger", and "pickaninny". Among these was another Milton Bradley game, Darky's Coon Game. The term "darkie" referred to the "exaggerated physiognomic features" depicting black people and associated with minstrel shows. In the book Ceramic Uncles & Celluloid Mammies: Black Images and Their Influence on Culture, Patricia Turner reported that she had heard of a black man sitting outside a theatre preceding a minstrel show, with his mouth open and children throwing balls into it for entertainment. The Cuban poet and journalist José Martí witnessed a similar scene at Coney Island and wrote about it.

It was one of many games produced at the time with a theme involving violence against black people, who were "encountering growing hostility" throughout the United States. The game depicted "a symbolic form of violence" that reinforced the servitude of black people. Another game with a more obvious theme of violence was "Hit the Dodger! Knock him Out!". It was also one of the objects produced at the time featuring a mouth and "black ingestion" as a stereotype of African Americans, such as the watermelon stereotype, also exemplified by the "Jolly Nigger Bank" into which coins are inserted into a mouth-shaped slot. The target consumer for the game was white people, who bought it for their children. These games and images reinforced "an encompassing theme of domination" by white people and subordination of black people. Turner states that such products reflected means by which "American consumers found acceptable ways of buying and selling the souls of black folk" even after the abolition of slavery in the United States, and the use of black images in advertising "figured prominently in commodity capitalism".

Today, the game is considered a collector's item. It is part of collectable black memorabilia, consisting of objects such as dolls, toys, and postcards that include those that are offensive or racist, even the "most contemptible examples" of such works. By 1993, there were about 50,000 black memorabilia collectors in the United States, about 70% of whom were African Americans.
