= Aunt Priscilla =

American food columnist

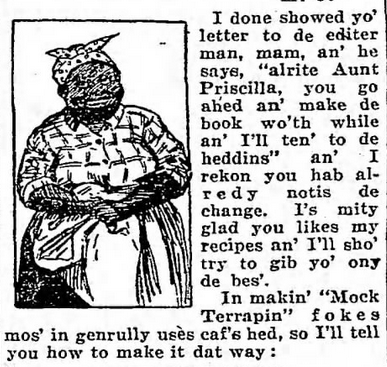
Image of Aunt Priscilla with some text from the column in 1921.

Aunt Priscilla was a pseudonym for the columnist Eleanor Purcell of The Baltimore Sun. Purcell used the image of the Mammy archetype to create a cooking column called Aunt Priscilla's Recipes which was purported to be written by an African American woman. The daily column was written in an exaggerated dialect.

== About ==
Aunt Priscilla purportedly was a daily food columnist for The Baltimore Sun and her column ran from the early 1920s through the 1940s. The columns were written as answers to culinary requests from readers of the newspaper and described how to cook traditional Southern recipes. The directions for the recipes were written with "inexperienced cooks or brides in mind," according to The Baltimore Sun.

Aunt Priscilla's columns were written in a dialect similar to Uncle Remus, according to writer, Alice Furlaud. Lisa Hix described the dialect as an "exaggerated slave dialect." Each publication included an illustration of a woman that could be considered "Jemima-like," according to Toni Tipton-Martin. In a 1951 book called The Amiable Baltimoreans, the author, Francis F. Beirne, refers to Aunt Priscilla as if she was a real person.

In fact, the column was written by Eleanor Purcell, who was white. Purcell's work, according to Tipton-Martin, "was a form of minstrelsy," but "it broke with the long tradition of simply taking and publishing African American recipes without giving black cooks credit." Purcell started working at The Baltimore Sun in 1916 and Aunt Priscilla's Recipes was her first feature for the paper.

In 1929, a compilation of recipes mostly featuring holiday themes was published. The book was called Aunt Priscilla in the Kitchen: A Collection of Wintertime Recipes. The column and the book both "are full of nostalgia for the old slave-owning south," said Furlaud. The Baltimore Sun wrote that the cookbook was "well received."

== See also ==
- Aunt Jemima
- Mammy archetype
