= Liberty Displaying the Arts and Sciences =

1792 painting by Samuel Jennings

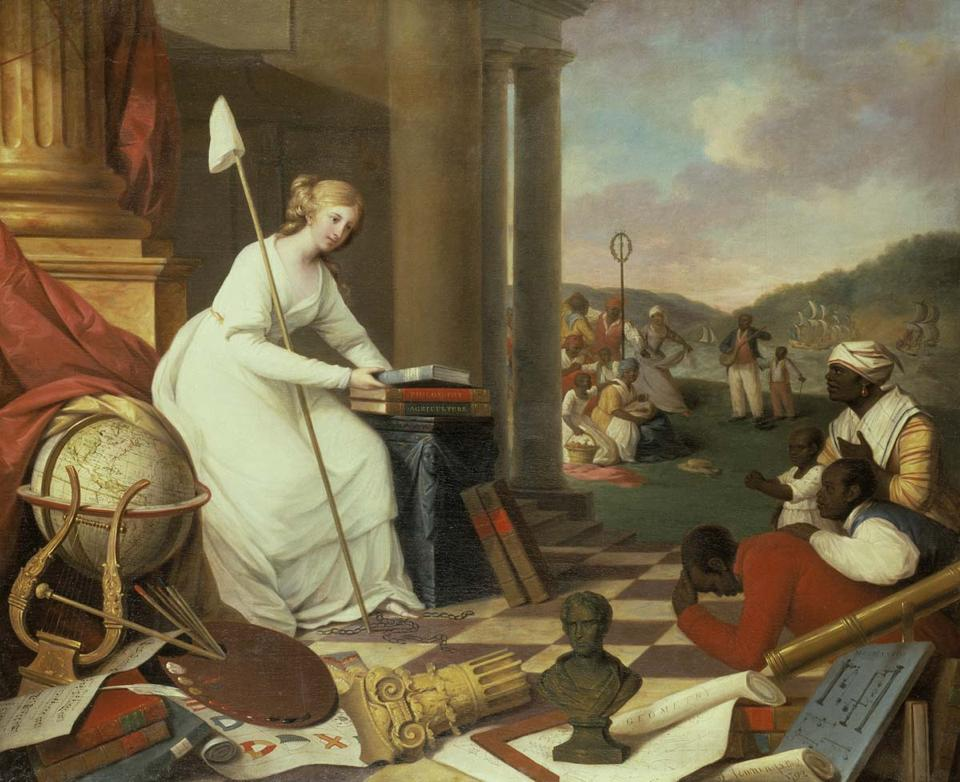
- Artist: Samuel Jennings
- Year: 1792
- Medium: Oil-on-canvas
- Dimensions: 153 cm × 190 cm (60 1/4 in × 74 in)
- Location: Library Company of Philadelphia

Liberty Displaying the Arts and Sciences, or The Genius of America Encouraging the Emancipation of the Blacks (1792) is an oil-on-canvas painting by the American artist Samuel Jennings. Held in the permanent collection of the Library Company of Philadelphia, this work is the earliest known American painting promoting abolitionism in the United States.

== Background and versions ==
The Library Company of Philadelphia, a private lending library founded by Benjamin Franklin in the mid-18th century, commissioned Jennings (an ex-Philadelphian relocated to London) to create a work depicting "the figure of Liberty (with her cap and proper Insignia) displaying the arts" as a representation of slavery and a symbol of the abolitionist movement. The library records the painting as having been given to it by the artist in March 1792, shortly after its completion in London.

Jennings completed two versions of the painting, both virtually identical save for size and composition. The larger version is oil on canvas and held by the Library Company of Philadelphia, while the smaller and lesser known version is oil on linen and held by Winterthur Museum, Garden and Library. The other major difference is that the smaller painting features the Union Jack on a shield among the symbolic objects surrounding the figure of Liberty. The smaller version was intended to serve as the basis for prints (never produced) meant for sale in Britain. The work is the earliest known anti-slavery painting by an American artist and reflect increasingly abolitionist sympathies of Philadelphia's Quaker leaders and institutions.

== Description ==
Jennings's allegory shows a blonde, white personification of Liberty, or according to the full title, personification of America wearing a white gown and with a liberty cap atop a pike or spear. She places books (the catalog of the Library Company, and two others, labeled "philosophy" and "agriculture") on top of a pedestal. Looking on is a group of two black men, a woman, and a child (freed slaves), whose comparatively diminutive size and clasped hands, bows, and other gestures evoke humility and gratitude.

Surrounding the five figures, in the foreground, are various symbols of knowledge and learning: a bust (possibly of Henry Thornton), a scroll (labeled "geometry"), a paper sketch of columns (architecture); a globe (geography), a lyre and sheet music (music), and a paper with escutcheons on it (history and heraldry). In the background, freed slaves are dancing and celebrating around a liberty pole as one plays the banjo; behind them are ships (symbolizing commerce) on a body of water.
