= Melissa Harris-Perry =

Scholar and American journalist

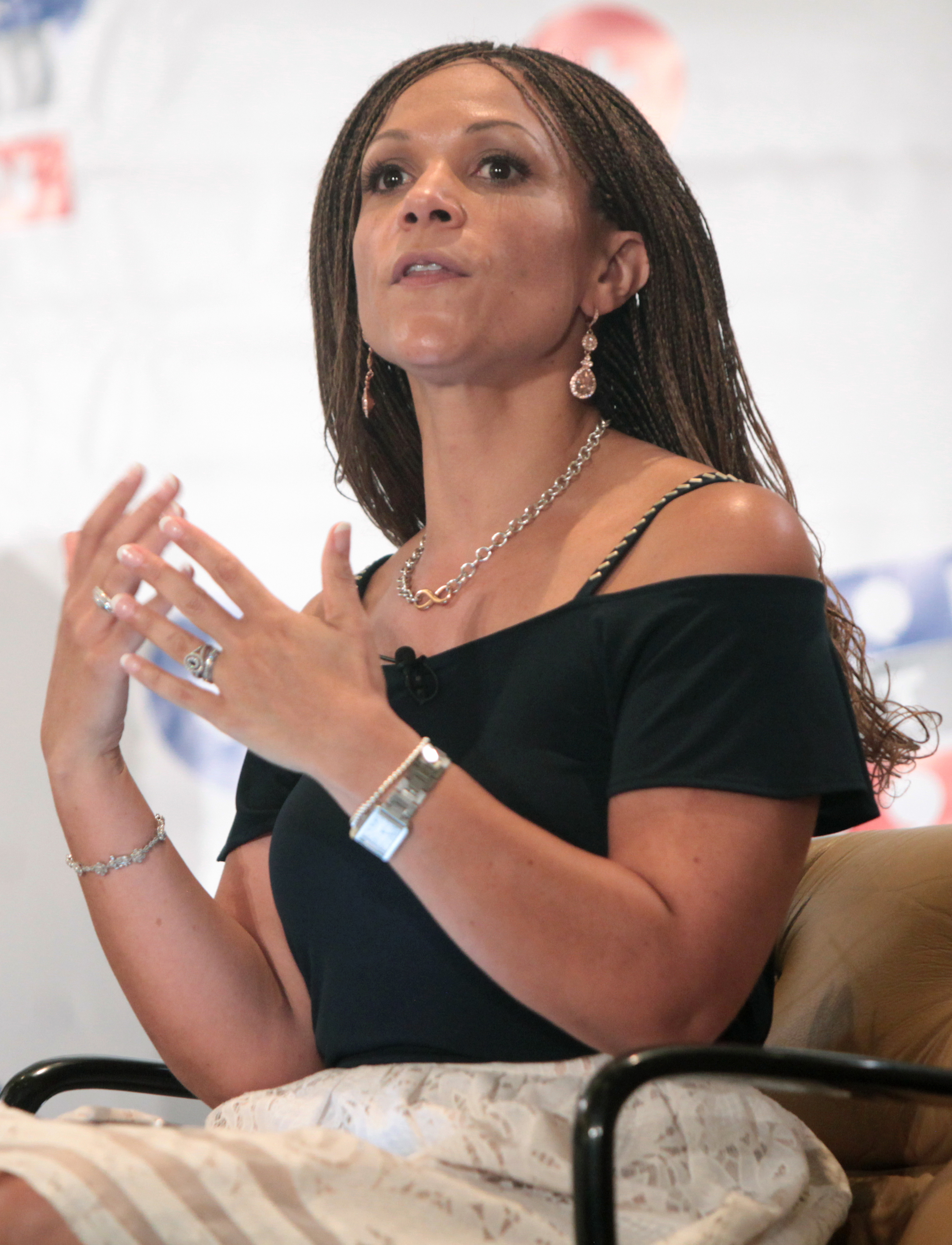
- Harris-Perry in 2016.
- Born: Melissa Victoria Harris; October 2, 1973 (age 52); Seattle, Washington, U.S.
- Education: Wake Forest University (BA); Duke University (MA, PhD)
- Occupations: Author, political commentator, professor
- Spouse(s): Dennis Lacewell (1999–2005); James Perry (2010–present)
- Children: 2 daughters
- Writing career
- Subjects: American politics, race relations
- Website: perrypolitical.com

Melissa Victoria Harris-Perry (born October 2, 1973), formerly known as Melissa Victoria Harris-Lacewell, is an American writer, professor, television host, and political commentator with a focus on African-American politics. Harris-Perry hosted the Melissa Harris-Perry weekend news on MSNBC from 2012 to February 27, 2016.

== Early life ==
Harris-Perry was born to a white mother and black father. She was born in Seattle and grew up in Chesterfield County, Virginia, one of the counties adjoining the independent city of Richmond, Virginia, where she attended Thomas Dale High School. Her father was the first dean of African-American Affairs at the University of Virginia. Harris-Perry's mother, Diana Gray, taught at a community college and was working on her doctorate when they met. She worked for non-profit organizations that provided services such as day-care centers, health care for people in rural communities, and access to reproductive care for poor women.

Harris-Perry graduated from Wake Forest University with a bachelor's degree in English and earned a PhD in political science from Duke University. She received an honorary doctorate from Meadville Lombard Theological School, and is studying toward a Master of Divinity in theology at Union Theological Seminary of Columbia University.

== Career ==
Harris-Perry joined the political science faculty of the University of Chicago in 1999 and taught there for seven years, until 2006, when she accepted a tenured appointment at Princeton University as an Associate Professor of Political Science and African-American Studies. Harris-Perry left Princeton in 2011 after being denied a full professorship for Tulane University, where she was Founding Director of the Anna Julia Cooper Project, a center for the study of race, gender, and politics in the South.

On July 1, 2014, Harris-Perry returned to Wake Forest as the Maya Angelou Presidential Chair Professor of Politics and International Affairs. The Anna Julia Cooper Project is now resident at Wake Forest.

She is a regular columnist for the magazine The Nation, the co-host of the magazine's podcast System Check with Dorian Warren, and the author of two books (one published under the name Melissa Victoria Harris-Lacewell).

=== MSNBC weekend morning news ===
On February 18, 2012, Harris-Perry began hosting an MSNBC weekend morning show titled Melissa Harris-Perry.

In early 2013, Harris-Perry was criticized by some political commentators for statements she made on her program related to collective parenting. On December 31, 2013, she apologized for a "photos of the year" segment on December 28, 2013, that included jokes about a family picture featuring former Republican presidential candidate Mitt Romney's family, including his adopted Black grandson.

==== Departure ====
On February 26, 2016, Harris-Perry sent an email to co-workers that she would not host her show on MSNBC for the coming weekend, stating: "Our show was taken—without comment or discussion or notice—in the midst of an election season [...] I will not be used as a tool for [management's] purposes [...] I am not a token, mammy, or little brown bobble head." Her show was scheduled to air as usual on Saturday, but Harris-Perry chose not to return, saying: "I am only willing to return when that return happens under certain terms." She said she would only return when she could do "substantive, meaningful and autonomous work." NBC responded that "many of our daytime programs have been temporarily upended by breaking political coverage, including M.H.P." The public dispute led to discussions between the network and her representatives about ending her relationship with MSNBC. On February 28, 2016, the network confirmed that Harris-Perry was leaving the network.

=== ELLE.com editor-at-large ===
On April 18, 2016, it was announced that Harris-Perry joined Elle.com as editor-at-large. In the role, Harris-Perry is stated to focus on areas of race, gender, politics, and fashion, "telling the often-overlooked stories of women and girls of color".

=== The Takeaway ===
On July 23, 2021, Harris-Perry was named as interim host of the radio news show The Takeaway, following the departure of the show's previous host, Tanzina Vega. She was later announced as the permanent host and managing editor on October 18, 2021.

In March 2023, Perry announced WNYC's decision to abruptly cancel the show effective June 2 of that year, criticizing management of WNYC publicly on Twitter.

== Personal life ==
In 2008, she underwent a hysterectomy due to uterine fibroids.

From 1999 to 2005, she was married to educator Dennis Lacewell. At age 28, she gave birth to her first child, a daughter named Parker. In 2010, she married attorney James Perry. He is the CEO of the Winston-Salem Urban League. On February 14, 2014, their daughter Anna was born via surrogate. She is Harris-Perry's second child.

In April 2015, the Winston-Salem Journal reported that the IRS had placed a tax lien on the property of Harris-Perry and her husband for about $70,000 in delinquent taxes. Harris-Perry said she and her husband paid $21,721 on April 15, 2015, and have a payment plan with the IRS.

== Bibliography ==
- Harris-Lacewell, Melissa Victoria (2004). Barbershops, Bibles, and BET: Everyday Talk and Black Political Thought (First ed.). Princeton University Press. ISBN 978-0-691-11405-7.
- Harris-Perry, Melissa V. (2011). Sister Citizen: Shame, Stereotypes, and Black Women in America. Yale University Press. ISBN 978-0-300-16541-8.
