= Association of German National Jews =

1920/30s German-Jewish assimilationist organization

The Association of German National Jews (German: Verband nationaldeutscher Juden, VnJ) was an assimilationist and nationalist German Jewish organization which was formed during the early years of the rule of the Weimar Republic and during the early years of the rule of Nazi Germany, that eventually came out in support of Adolf Hitler.

In 1935, the organization was outlawed, and its founder and leader Max Naumann was briefly imprisoned by the Gestapo at the Columbia concentration camp.

== Origins and founding ==
The Association of German National Jews was established in March 1921 by Max Naumann, a Berlin lawyer and decorated World War I veteran who had served as a captain in the Bavarian Army and received the Iron Cross (1st and 2nd Class). The founding treatise, On Nationalist German Jews, was published in 1920.

Naumann was its chairman until 1926, and, again, from 1933 to 1935, when the association was forcibly dissolved. The association was close to the national conservative and monarchist German National People's Party which, however, refused affiliation to the association.

== Goals ==
The goal of the association was the total assimilation of Jews into the German Volksgemeinschaft, self-eradication of Jewish identity, and the expulsion from Germany of Jewish immigrants from Eastern Europe. Naumann was especially opposed to Zionists, Marxists and Eastern European Jews (Ostjuden). He considered the former threats to Jewish integration, and carriers of a "racist" ideology serving British imperial purposes. He saw the latter as "racially" and spiritually "inferior". The agitation carried out by the VnJ against the Ostjuden was particularly welcomed by the Nazis to point out the supposedly great dangers of Eastern Jewish immigration to Germany.

The VnJ's founding statutes declared that its purpose was to represent "Germans of Jewish descent, who, while openly acknowledging their descent, feel so completely rooted in German culture and Wesen that they could not but think and feel as Germans."

The VnJ rejected Zionism, Marxism, and liberal cosmopolitanism, emphasizing absolute loyalty to the German nation-state. Naumann believed that Jews should cease to exist as a distinct national or cultural entity and instead define themselves solely as German citizens.

The VnJ was fiercely anti-Zionist, viewing Zionism as disloyal to Germany and as a movement serving foreign (especially British) imperialist interests. The association also campaigned against Eastern European Jewish immigrants (Ostjuden), whom it regarded as “racially” and culturally inferior. Naumann and his followers claimed that Eastern Jews endangered Jewish assimilation and reinforced antisemitic stereotypes.

== Activities ==
Among the activities of the association was the fight against the international anti-Nazi boycott of German products. It also issued a manifesto that claimed that the Jews were being "fairly treated". In 1934, the association made the following statement:

We have always held the well-being of the German people and the fatherland, to which we feel inextricably linked, above our own well-being. Thus, we greeted the results of January 1933, even though it has brought hardship for us personally.

A reason why some German Jews supported Hitler was that they thought that his anti-Semitism was only for "stirring up the masses". Also, they adhered to a kind of respectability politics that they hoped would lead to many non-Jews in the German Reich congratulating the VnJ with the phrase, "If only all Jews were like you."

The seemingly ironic fact that a Jewish association advocated loyalty to the Nazi program gave rise to a contemporary joke about Naumann and his followers ending their meeting by giving the Nazi salute and shouting "Down With Us!".

The association's official organ was the monthly Der nationaldeutsche Jude, edited by Max Naumann. The magazine had a circulation of 6,000 in 1927. Articles in the journal attacked Zionism, Marxism, and liberal Jews while portraying the VnJ as the only loyal and patriotic Jewish voice. Prominent contributors included Naumann, Felix Rachfahl, Alfred Peyser, and Georg Siegmann.

== Membership ==
The association’s headquarters were based in Berlin, and membership never exceeded a few thousand. Contemporary estimates range from 3,000 to 10,000 members. There were approximately 20 chapters across Germany.

The organization primarily attracted members from the anticommunist middle class, small business owners, self-employed professionals such as physicians and lawyers, national conservatives, and nationalist World War I veterans, many of whom believed that Nazi antisemitism was only a rhetorical tool used to "stir up the masses."

== Decline and dissolution ==
Despite the extreme nationalism of Naumann and his colleagues, the Nazi regime did not accept the Association of German National Jews as a legitimate intermediary. Following the passage of the Nuremberg Laws, the VnJ was declared illegal and dissolved on 18 November 1935. Naumann was arrested by the Gestapo the same day, and imprisoned at the Columbia concentration camp. He was released after a few weeks, and died of cancer in May 1939. Most other members and their families were murdered in the Holocaust.

== Legacy and interpretation ==
Although numerically small, the VnJ has been widely discussed by historians as an extreme case of assimilationism and internalized antisemitism. Scholars such as Carl Rheins and Matthias Hambrock describe it as an example of how sections of the German-Jewish bourgeoisie internalized nationalist rhetoric in hopes of social acceptance.

Historians such as Lionel Gossman argue that the VnJ's self-effacing ideology reveals the psychological pressures experienced by Jews attempting to reconcile patriotism with exclusion and persecution. Others have compared the association’s attitudes to later theories of respectability politics and internalized oppression.

== See also ==
- German Vanguard
- Internalized oppression
- Internalized racism
- Jewish assimilation
- Jewish collaboration with Nazi Germany
  - Jewish Ghetto Police
  - Judenrat
  - Kapo
- Neue Deutsche Esperanto-Bewegung, German Esperanto association which tried to adhere to national-socialist principles but was banned anyway.
- Respectability politics
- Self-hating Jew
- Turkeys voting for Christmas
