= Ostjuden =

Eastern European Jews in Germany

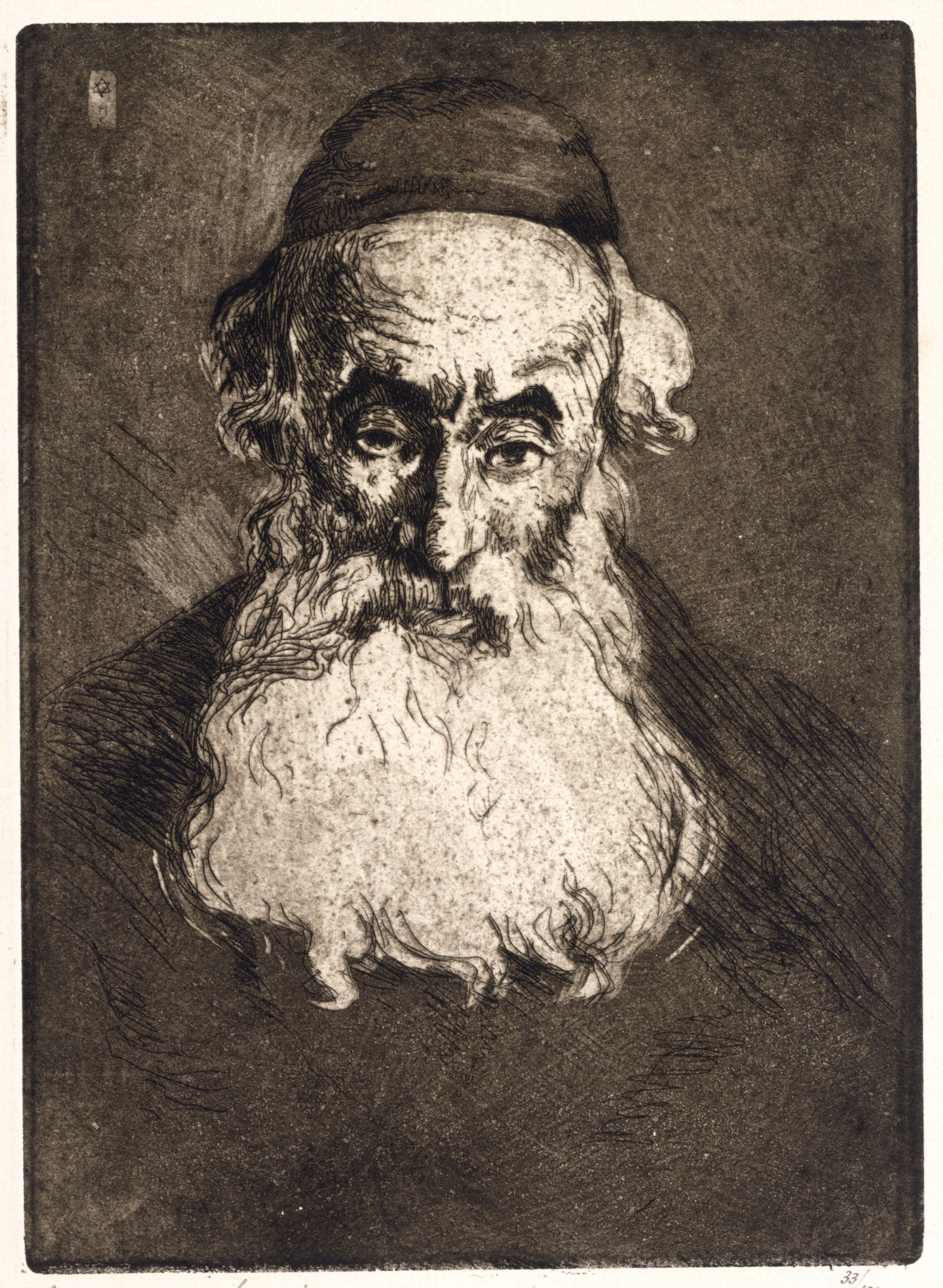
Hermann Struck, Chacham, en face ("Hakham, front-facing"), 1932, drypoint, aquatint

Ostjuden (German for "Eastern Jews"; singular Ostjude, adjective ostjüdisch) was a term used in Germany and Austria during the first half of the 20th century to refer to Jews from Eastern Europe. The term often had a pejorative connotation and, like other disparaging epithets of earlier use, evoked the negative qualities that German racism had attributed to Eastern European Jewry since the 19th century.

Because the stereotype of the Eastern Jew blended antisemitism with anti-Slavic sentiment and xenophobia, hostility toward Eastern European Jews could be found among both antisemitic non-Jewish Germans and assimilated German Jews alike. The latter sometimes reacted with fear and contempt to the arrival in Germany of Jews who spoke Yiddish, dressed differently, practised Orthodox Judaism, and lived in extreme poverty. Other German Jews, however, were fascinated by Eastern European Jews and viewed them with sympathy and admiration, seeing in them a more authentic form of Jewish life and religious expression, a resistance to the values of bourgeois society, and the prototype of a Jewish identity untainted by assimilation.

The term Ostjude was widely used in völkisch and Nazi antisemitic propaganda in the 1920s and 1930s, but has been used neutrally in Jewish historical studies since the 1980s. In the German-speaking Jewish world and in Israel, the Ostjude is contrasted with the Yekke (or Jecke), the stereotype of the German Jew, bourgeois and largely assimilated into Western European culture.

== Etymology ==
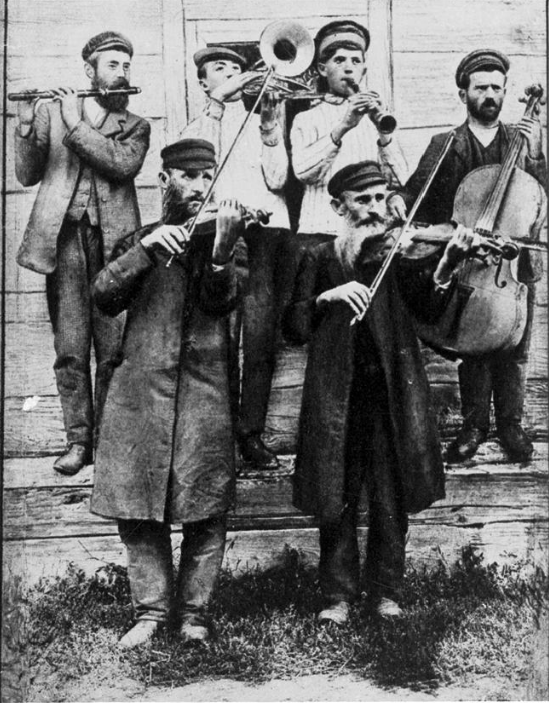
Klezmer musicians at a wedding in a photo by Menachem Kipnis, Ukraine, circa 1925

The precise origins of the German term Ostjude (literally "Eastern Jew") are difficult to trace. While it is frequently attributed to Nathan Birnbaum, a Jewish writer and journalist who used the adjective ostjüdisch in 1897 and introduced the noun Ostjude in 1904, this attribution is disputed among scholars.

Initially applied to Jews living in Eastern Europe, by the time of World War I the term was more specifically used to denote Eastern European Jewish migrants settling in Western Europe, and had acquired a pejorative connotation within German-speaking communities, joining the ranks of other derogatory labels like Schnorrer ("beggar"), Betteljude ("Jewish beggar"), and Polacke (a slang term for "Pole"). In Austria-Hungary, the Yiddish term Galitsianer was commonly used to denote Jews from Galicia and was sometimes extended to refer to Eastern European Jews in general.

The term Ostjude has also been used neutrally, without negative connotation, by Jewish intellectuals. Notably, Birnbaum and others, particularly in the years before World War I, sought to bridge the divide between native and immigrant German Jews by presenting a positive, sometimes idealised, image of Eastern European Jews. Furthermore, the term has been employed in a neutral sense in scholarly studies of Jewish history and culture, especially since the 1980s.

In the German-speaking Jewish world and in Israel, the Ostjude is often contrasted with the Yekke (or Jecke), who is the stereotypical German Jew, bourgeois, largely assimilated into Western European culture. In everyday conversation and writing, Yekke is often used as a synonym for snobbery and insensitive meticulousness, while the word Ostjude evokes the image of the Jew as a victim of his own people.

== Eastern European Jews in Germany ==
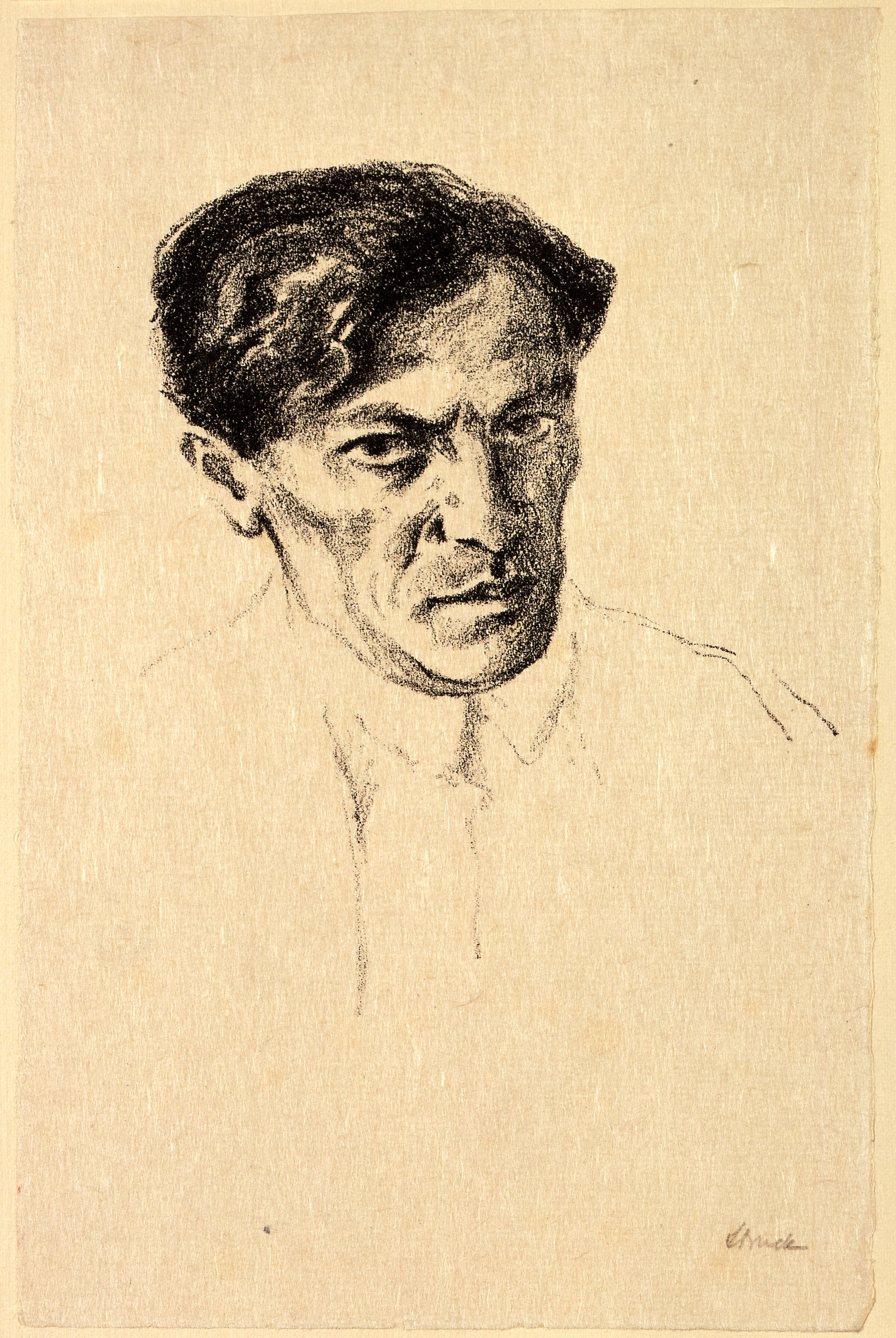
Struck, The Actor Kowalsky (Vilna), lithograph from the portfolio Skizzen aus Russland. Ostjuden ("Sketches from Russia: Jews of the East"), c. 1916

In Germany, Ostjuden generally referred to Jewish migrants from Eastern Europe who were present in small numbers throughout the 19th century, with far larger numbers passing through or arriving after the early 1880s. The label gained currency in public debate and increasingly took on a pejorative sense in the decades around World War I, when Germans began to complain about the "danger of the Eastern Jews" (Ostjudengefahr) or the "Eastern Jewish question" (Ostjudenfrage). In its derogatory sense, Ostjude evoked clichés of poverty, filth, ignorance, promiscuity, and cultural backwardness – negative qualities that German racism had projected onto Eastern European Jews since the 19th century, if not the 18th. To many Germans, including assimilated German Jews, they were seen as a separate and inferior ethnic community. Moreover, Jews in general and Eastern Jews in particular were accused of being dishonest and deceitful, as well as traitors to their country, enemy agents and communist revolutionaries.

These prejudices reflected and distorted real cultural and social differences between German Jews and Eastern European Jews. German Jews were largely assimilated and rarely spoke Yiddish, a language often disparaged as mere "jargon" (Jargon). Its use was seen as incompatible with higher culture, and all sectors of German-Jewish society were pressured to abandon it in their pursuit of modernisation and acculturation. Beyond language and accent, Eastern European Jews stood out for their distinctive dress (kaftan and payot), strict Talmudic education, and adherence to Hasidism, which clashed with the Enlightenment and bourgeois values embraced by Western Jews undergoing assimilation. Furthermore, they often lived in extreme poverty, concentrated in the dark and overcrowded ghettos of large cities or in isolated rural villages (shtetls), from which they fled due to pogroms and persecution. Economic poverty was accompanied by a lack of political rights: while Jewish emancipation in the West followed the French Revolution and was largely achieved by the 19th and 20th centuries, official antisemitism persisted in Russia, with violent manifestations as late as the 1880s.

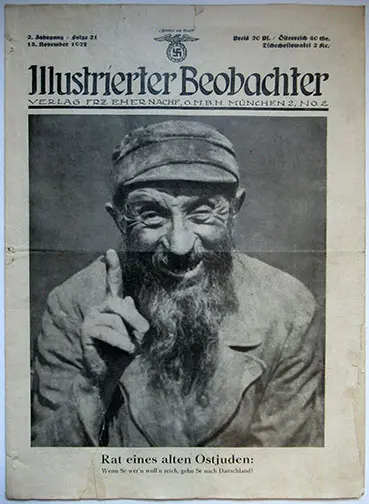
Cover of a German Nazi Party magazine Illustrierter Beobachter of 14 November 1927, showing the depiction of the stereotypical Ostjude

The stereotype of the Ostjude became a focal point for antisemitism, antislavism and xenophobia, attracting hostility from both openly antisemitic non-Jewish Germans and assimilated Jewish Germans alike. Among non-Jewish Germans, the historian Heinrich von Treitschke warned of the danger posed by the Polish-Jewish "tribe", described as "alien to the European, and especially to the German national character". Among assimilated Jewish Germans, journalist Hugo Ganz deplored the Ostjude's "laziness, their filth, their craftiness, their perpetual readiness to cheat", which, he wrote, gave rise to the "evil wish" that "this part of the Polish population did not exist at all". Similarly, the lawyer and activist Max Naumann described the Ostjuden as fundamentally foreign to German Jews – "foreign concerning the feelings, foreign concerning the spirit, physically foreign". The future German foreign minister Walther Rathenau characterised them as "a tribe of particularly foreign people", an "Asiatic horde on the sands of the March of Brandenburg", "not a living member of the people, but an alien organism in its body". Traces of the widespread prejudice against Eastern Jews can also be found in the work of the writer Karl Emil Franzos and in the autobiographical memoirs of Stefan Zweig.

This hostility also permeated political discourse. Official speeches and private comments rife with contempt towards Eastern European Jews were already present in the communications of Otto von Bismarck and spread from the 1880s, when political anti-Semitism was born in Germany. In a 1904 parliamentary speech, Chancellor Bernhard von Bülow denounced Eastern Jews as scroungers and conspirators. In the 1920s and 1930s, völkisch and Nazi propaganda further fueled these prejudices, appropriating the term Ostjude and its associated racist stereotype. This is evident in the political rhetoric of the Völkischer Beobachter, the official Nazi newspaper, which stoked fears about the "danger of the Ostjuden". Goebbels, other figures within the Nazi regime and the propaganda film The Eternal Jew (1940) exploited the same trope.

The so-called "Ostjuden problem" was largely a fabrication of antisemitic propaganda. The vast majority of Jewish immigrants were merely transiting through Germany on their way to America and other destinations and had no intention of settling in a country that, with its entrenched hostility, offered little opportunity for a flourishing Jewish cultural life. The fabricated crisis, however, had tangible consequences. During the Weimar Republic, it led to the persecution of Eastern European Jews, including deportations, internment in camps, and violent attacks. Even naturalisation was often deliberately protracted and arduous for fremdstämmige Ostjuden (foreign-born Eastern Jews).

Historian Steven E. Aschheim argues that the stereotypical image of the Ostjude stemmed from the divergence between a West where Jews were emancipated, assimilated and bourgeois, and an East where political exclusion of Jews and traditional Jewish culture persisted. In the 19th and 20th centuries, this divide, he suggests, contributed to a broader crisis in European Jewish society and its sense of international solidarity.

=== Fleeing the pogroms of the Russian Empire ===
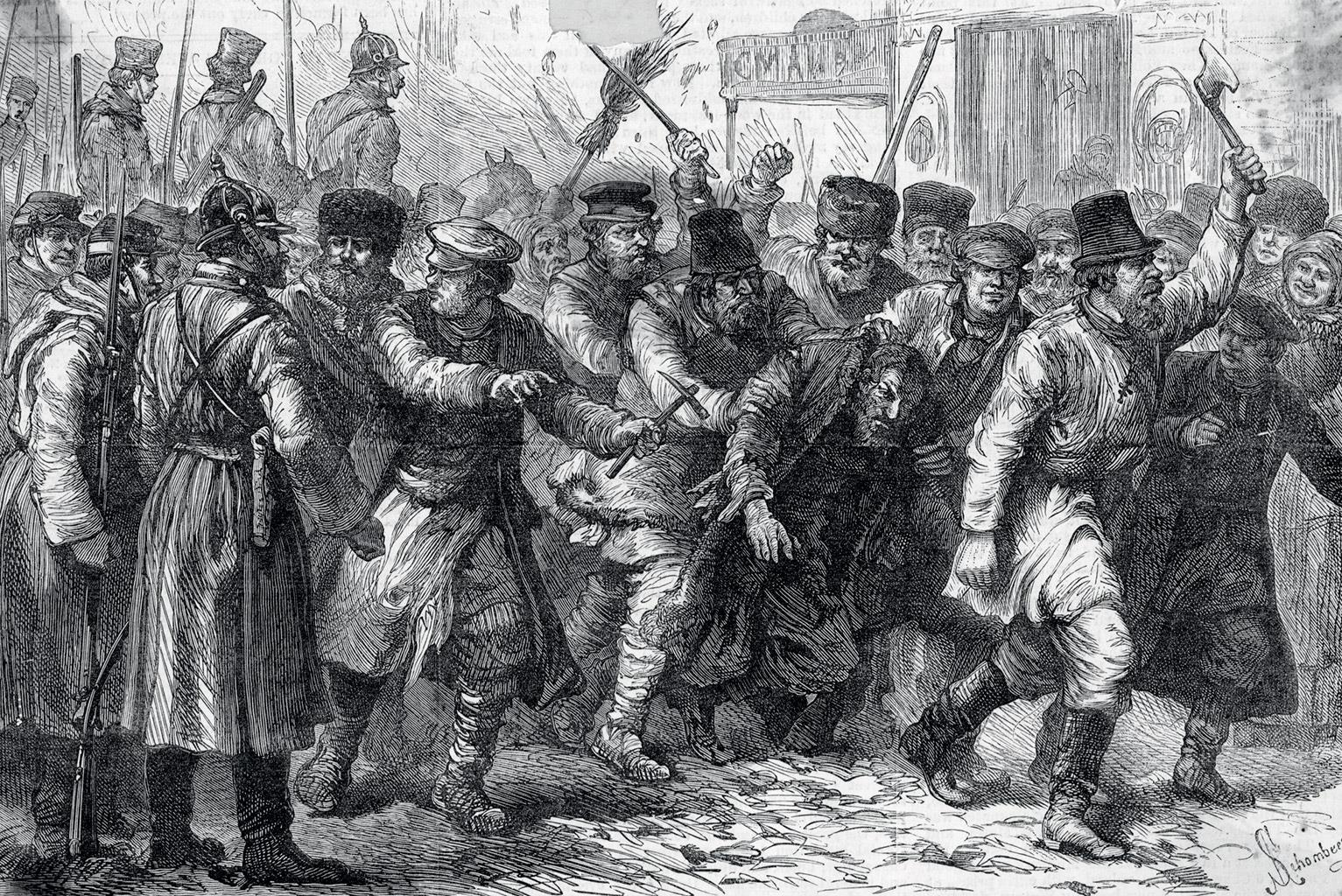
Pogrom in Kiev (1881). A Jew is mistreated while soldiers watch

Stereotypes of Eastern Jews circulated in Germany well before their large-scale arrival, but the so‑called “Ostjuden problem” became far more visible after a wave of pogroms swept through southern Russia and Ukraine between 1881 and 1884, followed by repressive measures and antisemitic state policies. This led to an unprecedented exodus of Eastern European Jews. Between 1881 and 1914, an estimated 2.4 to 2.7 million Jews fled Europe and sought refuge in America, South Africa, Palestine and Oceania. Most of these emigrants passed through Germany, heading for the ports of Hamburg and Bremen or other western European cities for their onward journeys. According to the historian David Vital, the influx of predominantly poor and less-educated Eastern European Jews was met with dismay by the established and emancipated Jewish communities of Western and Central Europe, who were confronted with the "sudden appearance on their doorsteps of a huge, untidy, endlessly marching army of distant cousins from the east".

In France and Britain, protests erupted against the "foreign invasion" of unskilled workers willing to accept any wage, and the never-dormant xenophobia and antisemitic sentiments of the native population re-emerged. In Germany, the situation was further complicated by the continuing public relevance of religious affiliation: since being Jewish and a member of a formally established religious community entailed special rights and obligations, the influx of Eastern Jews posed a particular problem of integration into local communities. German Jews feared that immigrants from the East would disqualify them in the eyes of their non-Jewish compatriots, partly because the alarm over the arrival of Eastern Jews was often fuelled by antisemitic publications against the national Jewish minority. The traditionalist orthodox orientation of Eastern Jews, as opposed to the liberal-reformist orientation prevalent in German Judaism, led to tensions in synagogue life and rivalries in the ordination of rabbis.

=== The cult of the Ostjuden ===
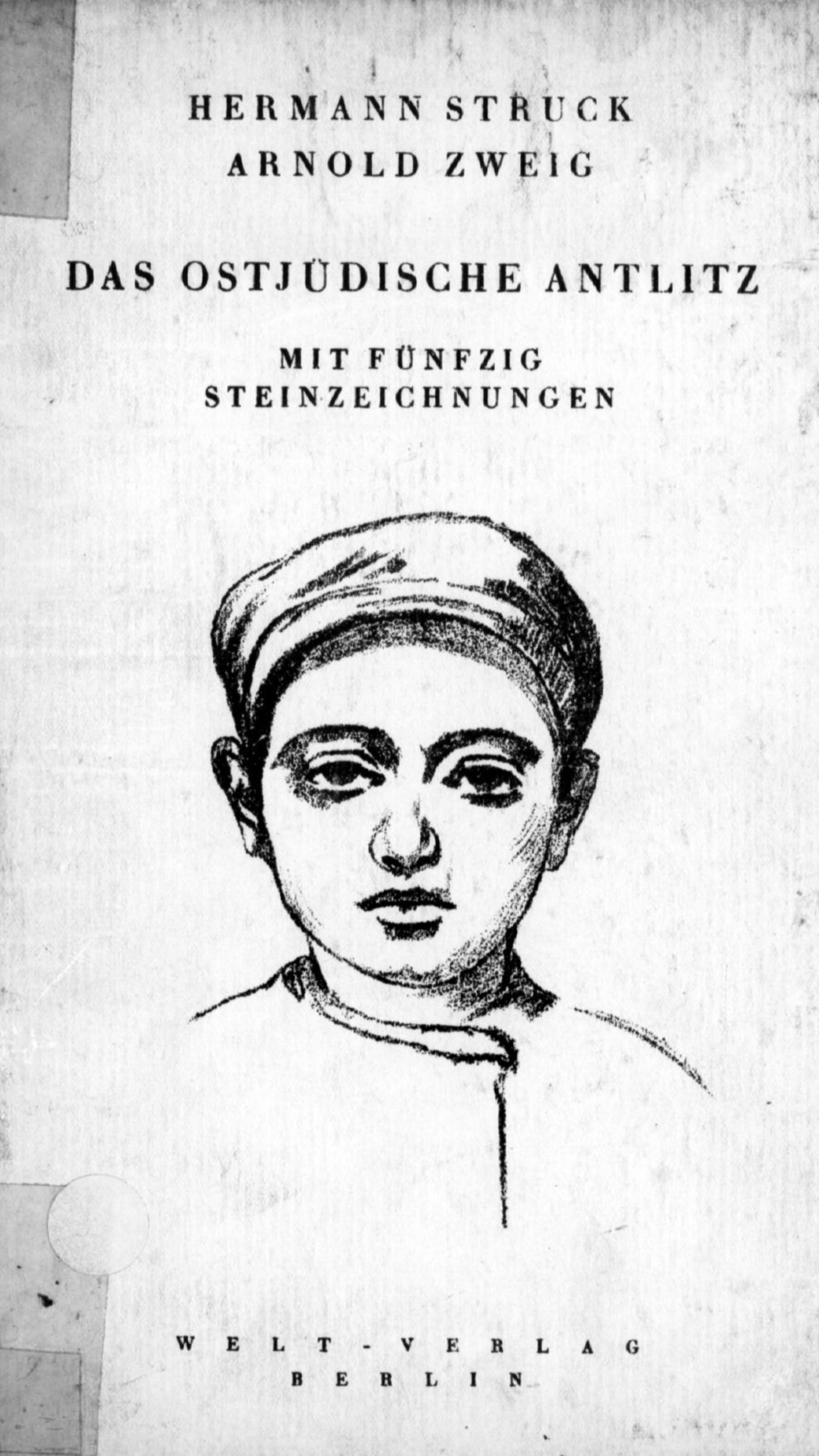
Cover of the book Das ostjüdische Antlitz (1920) by Arnold Zweig, illustrations by Struck

The attitude of German Jews towards their Eastern European coreligionists was not always marked by hostility or contempt. As German-Jewish literary scholar Claudia Sonino points out, writers such as Leopold Kompert and Aaron Bernstein depicted ghetto life "with sympathy and human warmth, stylising it with a sense of Gemütlichkeit and warm intimacy" as early as the 19th century. Traces of this inspiration are also visible in the correspondence of the German poet Heinrich Heine, who was born Jewish but later converted to Christianity; his letters reflect both disgust and a complex fascination with Eastern Jewry.

By the beginning of the 20th century, this ambivalence had evolved into a peculiar interpretation of the divide between Western and Eastern Jews. Among Jewish intellectuals, the Eastern European Jew came to be idealised as the embodiment of a more authentic form of life, religiosity, and resistance to bourgeois society and capitalist modernisation. This was what Gershom Sholem first dubbed the "cult of the Ostjuden".

Before World War I and in the early 1920s, the intellectuals associated with the journal Ost und West ("East and West") sought to raise awareness of Eastern European Jewish culture among German Jews. Hermann Cohen, a prominent neo-Kantian philosopher and one of the leading intellectuals of German Jewry, celebrated the Ostjuden's serene fortitude and noble naturalness. The liberal rabbi Felix Goldmann emphasised the fundamental unity and solidarity between German and Eastern European Jews, warning that "today the tide goes against Polish Jews, tomorrow against naturalised Jews, the day after against established German citizens".

The ambivalent attitude of German Jews towards the Eastern European Jews was also reflected in the internal debates of the Zionist movement. Zionism sought to unite Western and Eastern Jews through a shared national identity. In 1897, the founder of political Zionism, Theodor Herzl, said that the movement wanted to achieve "something remarkable and heretofore regarded as impossible: a close alliance between the ultra-modern and the ultra-conservative elements of Jewry ... A union of this kind is possible only on a national basis". This alliance was interpreted in various ways. Some, such as the Jewish scholar and writer Leon Pinsker, viewed it as a philanthropic rescue of Eastern European Jews by their wealthier Western counterparts. Others, such as the German communist Moses Hess and the Hungarian Zionist Max Nordau, viewed it as a means for Western Jews to be redeemed from the moral misery of assimilation and to rediscover the authentic Jewish identity embodied by the Eastern Jew.

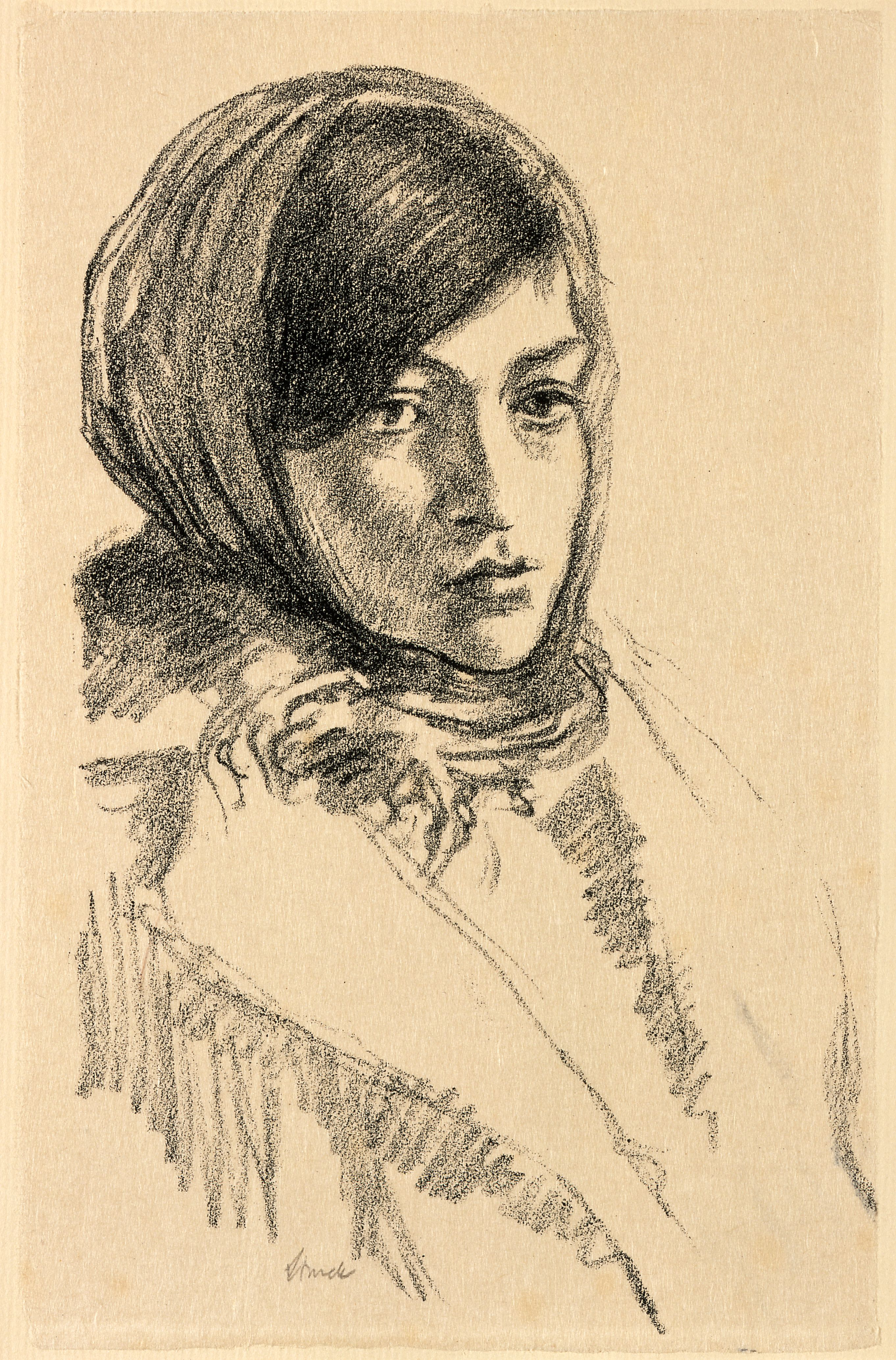
Hermann Struck, Luba (Białystok), lithograph from the portfolio Skizzen aus Russland. Ostjuden ("Sketches from Russia. Eastern Jews") c. 1916

The idealisation of Eastern Jewish identity was even more pronounced in the writings of cultural Zionists such as Ahad Ha'am, who criticised political Zionists, including Nordau, for being influenced by a "foreign culture" that was disconnected from the deep roots of Judaism. Similarly, Birnbaum criticised Western Judaism for lacking an original and autonomous culture. Birnbaum reversed the liberal order of priorities, calling for the emancipation of Eastern Judaism from Western Judaism. Contrary to the Zionist aim of transcending Eastern Jewish identity, Birnbaum promoted the use of the Yiddish language and, in the last years of his life, embraced Orthodox religious views.

Another key figure in the "cult of the Ostjuden" is the German Jewish writer Arnold Zweig. Influenced by Buber's Hasidic writings, Zweig felt alienated from both institutional German Judaism and official Zionism. His 1920 book Das ostjüdische Antlitz ("The Eastern Jewish Face"), featuring illustrations by Hermann Struck, stated: "This book speaks of the Eastern Jews as someone who has tried to see them". Struck's beautifully crafted portraits challenged the prevailing stereotype by showing that "The Eastern Jewish countenance was not hideous nor depraved but reflected beauty, hidden strength, and great sensitivity".

The idealisation of the Ostjude became a significant theme also in the works of Joseph Roth, in Martin Buber's Tales of the Hasidim, in Alfred Döblin's Journey to Poland and in the work of Franz Kafka. According to literary critic and Germanist Giuliano Baioni, Kafka's work is marked by the anguished "awareness of the fragmentation of the ostjüdisch unity". After the Holocaust, a sense of brotherhood with the Ostjuden emerges in Primo Levi’s poetry, notably in a piece from Ad ora incerta.

The sociologist Zygmunt Bauman argues that the idealisation of the Ostjude by German Jews sometimes echoed rising völkisch nationalism, incorporating themes of blood, soil, rootedness in the ethnic community, virility and courage. As Bauman notes, "Once more, the 'Eastern European Jews' turn into a myth construed according to the latest concerns of their more civilized Western kin".

=== The Wandering Jews by Joseph Roth ===
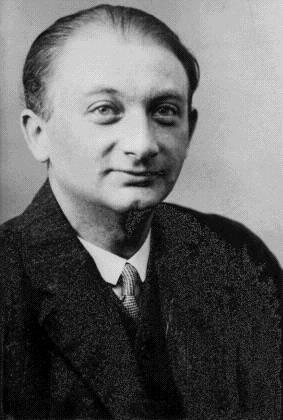
Joseph Roth, author of The Wandering Jews, in 1926

A testimony and a reflection on the living conditions of Eastern European Jews can be found in Roth's 1927 essay Juden auf Wanderschaft (The Wandering Jews). Roth, himself an Eastern European Jew who had moved to Vienna, set out to describe the life and circumstances of this community in the hope, as he wrote, "that there may still be readers from whom the Eastern Jews do not require protection":

readers with respect for pain, for human greatness, and for the squalor that everywhere accompanies misery; Western Europeans who are not merely proud of their clean mattresses. These are the readers who feel they might have something to learn from the East, and who have perhaps already sensed that great people and great ideas ... have come from Galicia, Russia, Lithuania, and Romania

Roth sympathetically describes the suffering of Eastern European Jews and their urge to emigrate to the West. Roth's Ostjude is idealised as both "a son of the soil" and an "intellectual". In describing his life in the Eastern European shtetl, Roth seeks to portray not only its misery and authoritarian patriarchal constraints but also "the boundless vastness of the horizon, the richness of human material, the authentic and intact humanity". The shtetl emerges as a timeless system governed by messianic hope, its values forming a communal utopia – a counterpoint to the malaise of Western society. Thus, The Wandering Jews also serves as a warning against the illusions of assimilation, depicting the decline of Eastern Judaism and its dissolution in the West: "They gave themselves up. They lost themselves. They shed their aura of sad beauty. Instead, a dust-grey layer of suffering without meaning and anxiety without tragedy settled on their stooped backs".

In the 1937 preface to the second edition of The Wandering Jews, Roth observed that the title's scope had broadened to encompass not only Eastern European Jewish refugees but also native German Jews, now "more exposed and more homeless even than [their] cousin in Lodz had been a few years before". When the book was written, "What mattered ... was to persuade the Jews and non-Jews of Western Europe to grasp the tragedy of the Eastern Jews", because "It is an often ignored fact that Jews, too, are capable of anti-Semitism", but now it was time to face the new problem of Western Jews fleeing Nazi persecution without passports or entry visas: "And what is a man without papers? Rather less, let me tell you, than papers without a man!".

=== After 1945 ===
After World War II, tensions arose within the newly re-established Jewish communities in Germany. Assimilated German Jewish survivors, many of whom had endured the war by hiding or through the protection of mixed marriage, regarded the incoming Orthodox Jewish displaced persons from Eastern Europe with suspicion. These reservations were rooted in social, cultural, and linguistic differences, and revived old stereotypes of Ostjuden. Conversely, many Eastern European Jews, often Zionist-leaning and eager to leave Germany, looked down on the German Jews. They criticised the separate community structures and accused the German Jews of not sharing the collective Jewish destiny. Despite these tensions, Eastern European Jews often became the backbone, and in some cases the majority, of postwar German Jewish communities.

== See also ==
- Anti-Slavic sentiment – Hostility, prejudice, or discrimination against Slavic peoples
- Antisemitism in Europe
- Eastern European Jewry – Bloc of Jewish diasporas
- Hasidic Judaism – Religious subgroup of modern Judaism
- History of the Jews in Germany
- Jewish assimilation – Social process or ideology
- Jewish ethnic divisions – Jewish subgroups
- More German than the Germans – Phrase describing Jews in pre-war Germany
- Xenophobia – Fear and dislike of that which is perceived to be foreign or strange

== Bibliography ==
- Aschheim, Steven E. (1982a). Brothers and Strangers: The East European Jew in German and German Jewish Consciousness, 1800–1923. The University of Wisconsin Press. ISBN 0-299-09110-4.
- Aschheim, Steven E. (1982b). "Caftan and Cravat: The Ostjude as a Cultural Symbol in the Development of German Anti-Semitism". In Drescher, Seymour; Sabean, David; Sharlin, Allan (eds.). Political Symbolism in Modern Europe. Essays in Honor of George L. Mosse. London and New York: Routledge. pp. 81–99. doi:10.4324/9781003070276-6. ISBN 978-0-87855-422-5.
- Aschheim, Steven E. (2008). "Reflection, Projection, Distortion: The "Eastern Jew" in German-Jewish Culture". Osteuropa. 58 (8/10). Berliner Wissenschafts-Verlag: 61–74. ISSN 0030-6428. JSTOR 44934276.
- Bauman, Zygmunt (2007). Modernity and Ambivalence. Cambridge: Polity. ISBN 978-0-7456-1242-3.
- Beck, Hermann (2022). "Ostjuden as Predetermined Targets". Before the Holocaust: Antisemitic Violence and the Reaction of German Elites and Institutions during the Nazi Takeover. Oxford: Oxford University Press. pp. 73–102. doi:10.1093/oso/9780192865076.003.0003. ISBN 978-0-19-195553-2.
- Birnbaum, Nathan (1916). Was sind Ostjuden? Zur ersten Information [What are Ostjuden? For a First Introduction]. Flugschriften zur Aufklärung über ostjüdische Fragen (in German). Vol. 1. Vienna: Löwit Verlag.
- Block, Nick (2013). "Ex Libris and Exchange: Immigrant Interventions in the German-Jewish Renaissance". The German Quarterly. 86 (3): 334–353. doi:10.1111/gequ.10186. ISSN 0016-8831. JSTOR 42751553.
- Brenner, David A. (1995). "Promoting East European Jewry: Ost und West, Ethnic Identity, and the German-Jewish Audience". Prooftexts. 15 (1): 63–88. ISSN 0272-9601. JSTOR 20689407.
- Brenner, David A. (1997). "Neglected "Women's" Texts and Contexts: Vicki Baum's Jewish Ghetto Stories". Women in German Yearbook. 13: 100–121. doi:10.1353/wgy.1997.0002. ISSN 1058-7446. JSTOR 20688857.
- Brenner, Michael (2019). Geschichte des Zionismus (in German). Munich: C.H. Beck. ISBN 978-3-406-74166-1. OCLC 1127928000.
- Fuchs, Anne (1999-01-01). "Roth's Ambivalence: The Logic of Separation in His Writings on Eastern Jewry". A Space of Anxiety: Dislocation and Abjection in Modern German-Jewish Literature. BRILL. pp. 81–122. doi:10.1163/9789004657632_006. ISBN 978-90-420-0797-0.
- Kałczewiak, Mariusz (2021). "When the Ostjuden Returned: Linguistic Continuities in German-Language Writing about Eastern European Jews". Naharaim. 15 (2). Walter de Gruyter GmbH: 287–309. doi:10.1515/naharaim-2020-0015. ISSN 1862-9148.
- Klier, John D. (1999). "Westjuden: Germany and German Jews through East European Eyes". The German Lands and Eastern Europe. London: Palgrave Macmillan UK. pp. 136–156. doi:10.1007/978-1-349-27094-1_7. ISBN 978-1-349-27096-5.
- Kliymuk, Alexander (2018). "The Construct of Ostjuden in German Anti-Semitic Discourse of 1920–1932". Scripta Judaica Cracoviensia. 16: 97–108. doi:10.4467/20843925SJ.18.002.10821 (inactive 1 July 2025).
- Laor, Dan (1993). "Agnon in Germany, 1912-1924: A Chapter of a Biography". AJS Review. 18 (1): 75–93. doi:10.1017/S0364009400004402. ISSN 0364-0094. JSTOR 1486799.
- Lichtblau, Albert (2009). "'Galitsianer' and the Mobility of Stereotypes". Jewish Culture and History. 11 (1–2): 84–105. doi:10.1080/1462169X.2009.10512117. ISSN 1462-169X.
- Magris, Claudio (1989). Lontano da dove. Joseph Roth e la tradizione ebraico-orientale [Far From Where? Joseph Roth and East European Jewish Tradition] (in Italian). Einaudi. ISBN 9788858422328.
- Maksymiak, Małgorzata A. (2019). "Beggars, nymphomaniac women, miracle rabbis and other East European Jews: the East as a category of social difference". Journal of Modern Jewish Studies. 19 (4): 434–449. doi:10.1080/14725886.2019.1678819. ISSN 1472-5886.
- Roth, Joseph (2001). The Wandering Jews. London: Granta Books. ISBN 978-1-86207-470-5.
- Saß, Anne-Christin (2017). "Ostjuden". In Diner, Dan (ed.). Encyclopedia of Jewish History and Cultures Online. Brill. doi:10.1163/2468-8894_ejhc_COM_0608.
- Seelig, Rachel (2016). Strangers in Berlin: Modern Jewish literature between East and West, 1919-1933. Ann Arbor, Michigan: University of Michigan Press. ISBN 978-0-472-12228-8. OCLC 959956289.
- Sonino, Claudia (1998). Esilio, diaspora, terra promessa: ebrei tedeschi verso Est [Exile, diaspora, promised land: German Jews towards the East] (in Italian). Milano: Mondadori. ISBN 978-88-424-9475-1.
- Spinner, Samuel J. (2016). "Plausible Primitives: Kafka and Jewish Primitivism". The German Quarterly. 89 (1): 17–35. doi:10.1111/gequ.10253. ISSN 0016-8831. JSTOR 24756645.
- Vital, David (1999). A people apart: The Jews in Europe, 1789-1939. Oxford University Press. ISBN 0-19-821980-6. OCLC 40338446.
- Volková, Bronislava (2021). "Exile as Expulsion and Wandering: Joseph Roth, Sholem Aleichem, Stefan Zweig". Forms of Exile in Jewish Literature and Thought: Twentieth-Century Central Europe and Migration to America. Academic Studies Press. pp. 20–26. doi:10.2307/j.ctv2175r23.5. ISBN 978-1-64469-405-3. JSTOR j.ctv2175r23.5.
- Weinbaum, Laurence; McPherson, Colin (2000). "No Milk and No Honey: The Yekkes and the Ostjuden". Jewish Quarterly. 47 (3): 25–30. doi:10.1080/0449010X.2000.10705191 (inactive 1 July 2025).
- Wertheimer, Jack (1987). Unwelcome Strangers: East European Jews in Imperial Germany. Oxford University Press. ISBN 9781423737339.
- Zweig, Arnold; Struck, Hermann (1920). Das ostjüdische Antlitz. Mit fünfzig Steinzeichnungen [The East Jewish Countenance. With fifty lithographs] (in German). Berlin: Welt-Verlag.
