= List of awards and honours received by Helmut Kohl =

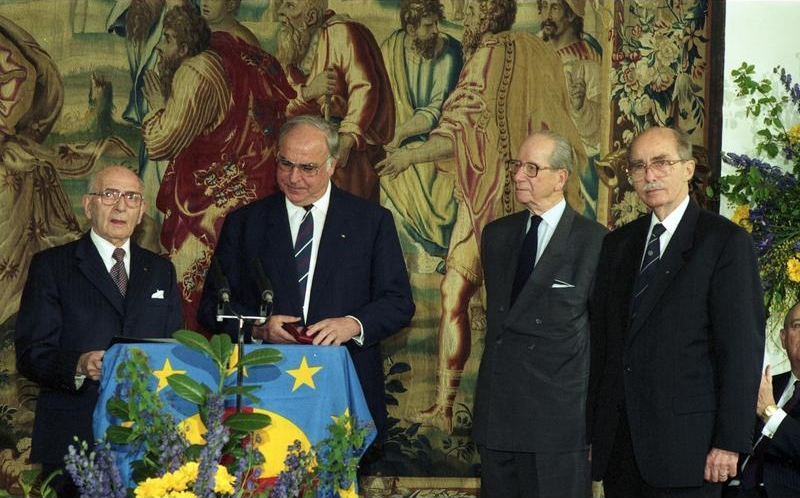
Kohl receiving the Coudenhove-Kalergi-Preis in April 1991

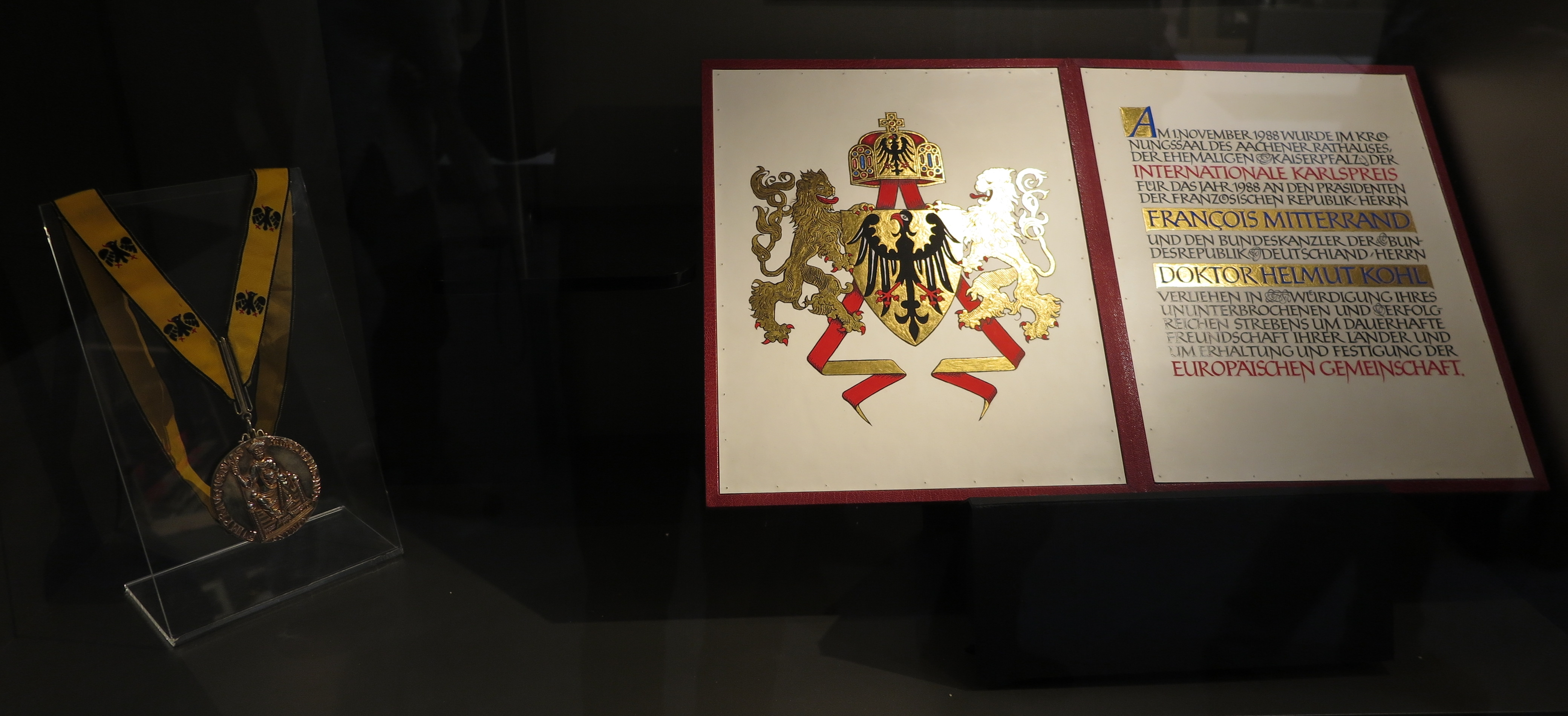
The Charlemagne Prize certificate and medal awarded to François Mitterrand and Kohl in 1988

The following is a list of accolades and honors conferred upon the sixth chancellor of the Federal Republic of Germany, Helmut Kohl.

== Honorary degrees and citizenships ==
Honorary doctorates (selection)
| Year | Institution |
|---|---|
| 1990 | (Israel) Tel Aviv University |
| 1990 | (United States) University of Maryland |
| 1990 | (Poland) John Paul II Catholic University of Lublin |
| 1990 | (United States) Harvard University |
| 1991 | (Spain) University of Salamanca |
| 1991 | (United Kingdom) University of Edinburgh |
| 1991 | University of Chile |
| 1993 | (Turkey) Istanbul University |
| 1993 | (Japan) Sophia University, Tokyo |
| 1993 | (Bulgaria) Sofia University |
| 1995 | (Israel) Ben-Gurion University of the Negev, Faculty of Philosophy |
| 1996 | (Belgium) Katholieke Universiteit Leuven |
| 1996 | (Ukraine) Taras Shevchenko National University of Kyiv |
| 1996 | (Philippines) Ateneo de Manila University |
| 1996 | (Japan) Keio University, Tokyo |
| 1998 | (United States) Brandeis University, Faculty of Law |
| 1998 | (United Kingdom) University of Cambridge |
| 1999 | (Belgium) University of Liège |
| 2000 | (Poland) University of Wrocław, Faculty of Theology |
| 2000 | (Netherlands) University of Groningen |

Honorary citizenships
| Year | Institution |
|---|---|
| 1985 | (Austria) St. Gilgen |
| 1992 | (Germany) Berlin^{1} |
| 1998 | (United Kingdom) London |
| 1998 | (Europe) Honorary Citizen of Europe^{2} |
| 1999 | (Germany) Frankfurt am Main |
| 2005 | (Germany) Ludwigshafen |
| 2010 | (Poland) Gdańsk |

^1 – Given on 9 November 1992, the third anniversary of the fall of the Berlin Wall to Kohl, Ronald Reagan and Mikhail Gorbachev.
^2 – Received on 11 December 1998 at the Hofburg Palace, Vienna. The only other honorary citizenship of Europe was given to Jean Monnet in 1976.

== Accolades ==
| Year | Accolade | Institution | Note |
|---|---|---|---|
| 1977 | Order of Merit of the Italian Republic | President of Italy | |
| 1984 | Grand Cross of the Order of Christ | President of Portugal | |
| 1988 | Grand Cross of the Order of Prince Henry | President of Portugal | |
| 1988 | Charlemagne Prize | (Germany) City of Aachen, Society for the Conferring of the International Charlemagne Prize of Aachen | For "distinguished service on behalf of European unification", joint recipient with François Mitterrand. |
| 1990 | Coudenhove-Kalergi-Europapreis | (Europe) European Society Coudenhove-Kalergi | |
| 1991 | Europe Prize for Statesmanship | (Germany) Alfred Toepfer Stiftung F.V.S. | |
| 1993 | Deutscher Medienpreis (de) | (Germany) Media Control (de) | Laudation by Jens Feddersen (de). |
| 1994 | Bavarian Order of Merit | (Germany) Minister-President of Bavaria | Laudation by Edmund Stoiber. |
| 1994 | Konrad-Adenauer-Freiheitspreis | Germany Foundation | For life achievement towards freedom, peace and unity. Laudation by Otto von Habsburg. |
| 1995 | Concord-Preis | (Germany) City of Krefeld | For merit towards a German-American partnership. |
| 1996 | Presidential Gold Medal | (United States) B'nai B'rith | Laudation by Shimon Peres. |
| 1996 | European of the Year | (France) La Vie | Laudation by Jacques Delors. |
| 1996 | Order of Ouissam Alaouite’ | King of Morocco | Received from Hassan II of Morocco. |
| 1996 | Eric M. Warburg Award | (Germany) Atlantik-Brücke | Laudation by George H. W. Bush. |
| 1996 | Honorary membership | (Indonesia) Society of Indonesian Engineers | |
| 1996 | Prince of Asturias Award in International Cooperation | (Spain) Princess of Asturias Foundation | Received from Felipe VI of Spain, then Prince of Asturias. |
| 1997 | Leo-Baeck-Preis | Central Council of Jews in Germany | Laudation by George Weidenfeld, Baron Weidenfeld. |
| 1997 | The George C. Marshall Foundation Award | (United States) George C. Marshall Foundation | Received from Madeleine Albright at a Gala Dinner celebrating the 50th Anniversary of The Marshall Plan Speech in Washington, D.C. |
| 1997 | Europäischer St.-Ulrichs-Preis (de) | (Germany) Europäische St.-Ulrichs-Stiftung, Dillingen an der Donau | Laudation by Theo Waigel. |
| 1997 | Vision for Europe Award | (Luxembourg) Edmond Israel Foundation | For "tireless commitment in the interest of European integration". |
| 1998 | Order of the White Eagle | President of Poland | Received from Aleksander Kwaśniewski. |
| 1998 | Grand Cross in Special Design of the Order of Merit of the Federal Republic of Germany | President of Germany | Only the second - after Konrad Adenauer - to receive this honour. Received from Roman Herzog. |
| 1999 | Order of the Netherlands Lion | Kingdom of the Netherlands | Recognised as "Chancellor of Europe", received from Wim Kok. |
| 1999 | Order of Leopold | Kingdom of Belgium | Received from Jean-Luc Dehaene. |
| 1999 | Presidential Medal of Freedom | President of the United States of America | Received from Bill Clinton. |
| 1999 | Statesman of the Decade | (United States) EastWest Institute | Laudation by Henry Kissinger. Ceremony attended by George H. W. Bush and Kofi Annan. |
| 1999 | Goldene Henne (de) | (Germany) Superillu, Mitteldeutscher Rundfunk, Rundfunk Berlin-Brandenburg | |
| 1999 | St.-Liborius-Medaille für Einheit und Frieden (de) | (Germany) Roman Catholic Archdiocese of Paderborn | |
| 1999 | Olympic Order | International Olympic Committee | |
| 2000 | Millennium Medal | Government of Hungary | Received from Viktor Orbán. |
| 2000 | Preis des Westfälischen Friedens (de) | (Germany) Wirtschaftliche Gesellschaft für Westfalen und Lippe e. V. | |
| 2001 | Elsie-Kühn-Leitz-Preis (de) | (Germany) Vereinigung Deutsch-Französischer Gesellschaften für Europa (de) | For "an active contribution towards German-French relations". |
| 2003 | Order of Merit | (France) Académie des Sciences Morales et Politiques | |
| 2004 | International Adalbert Prize | (Germany) Adalbert-Stiftung (de) | Laudation by Władysław Bartoszewski. |
| 2004 | Alcide de Gasperi Prize | | Commemorating the 50th anniversary of the death of Alcide de Gasperi. |
| 2005 | Global Leadership Award | (United States) Chicago Council on Foreign Relations | |
| 2005 | Point-Alpha-Preis (de) | (Germany) Kuratorium Deutsche Einheit e.V. | First recipient, joint with George H. W. Bush and Mikhail Gorbachev. |
| 2005 | Franz Josef Strauß-Preis (de) | (Germany) Hanns Seidel Foundation | Laudation by Theo Waigel. |
| 2005 | Quadriga | (Germany) Verein Werkstatt Deutschland | Laudation by Mikhail Gorbachev. |
| 2006 | Special award of the Konrad Adenauer Prize for Municipal Politics | (Germany) Kommunalpolitische Vereinigung der CDU und CSU Deutschlands | Laudation by Roland Koch. |
| 2006 | Order of the Cross of Terra Mariana | President of Estonia | Received from Prime Minister Andrus Ansip. |
| 2006 | Carlos V. European Award | (Spain) European Academy of Yuste Foundation | Received from Juan Carlos I of Spain. |
| 2006 | Honorary membership | (Germany) Alfred-Delp-Gesellschaft | For "promoting the remembrance of the military resistance" in National Socialism. |
| 2007 | Médaille d'or | (Switzerland) Jean Monnet Foundation for Europe | Received from Micheline Calmy-Rey. |
| 2007 | Prize for Understanding and Tolerance | (Germany) Jewish Museum, Berlin | Laudation by Salomon Korn, Vice-President of the Central Council of Jews in Germany. |
| 2009 | BILD Osgar (de) | (Germany) Media Prize of Bild | Joint recipient with George H. W. Bush and Mikhail Gorbachev. |
| 2009 | Distinguished Leadership Award | (United States) Atlantic Council | Joint recipient with George H. W. Bush. |
| 2009 | Hanns Martin Schleyer Prize | (Germany) Hanns Martin Schleyer Foundation | Laudation by Jean-Claude Juncker. |
| 2009 | Millennium Bambi Award | (Germany) Hubert Burda Media | |
| 2010 | Roland Berger Preis für Menschenwürde (de) | (Germany) Roland Berger Stiftung (de) | |
| 2010 | Grand Order of Queen Jelena | Republic of Croatia | Received in Ludwigshafen. |
| 2011 | Henry A. Kissinger Prize | (Germany) / (United States) American Academy in Berlin | Laudations by Bill Clinton and Robert B. Zoellick. Remarks by Angela Merkel and Philip D. Murphy. |
| 2011 | Special Prize "Golden Bridge of Dialogue 2010" | (Poland) / (Germany) Haus der Deutsch-Polnischen Zusammenarbeit (de) | For "extraordinary merit toward German-Polish reconciliation". |
| 2011 | Pfälzer Löwe | (Germany) Bezirksverband Pfalz (de) | Laudation by Philipp Mißfelder. |

== Namesakes ==
- In 1995, the Institute of European Studies at the Hebrew University of Jerusalem, founded in 1991, was renamed Helmut Kohl Institute in his honor.
- Several streets in Germany bear his name.
