= German Vanguard =

1930s Jewish Pro-Nazi organization

The German Vanguard: A Fellowship of German Jews (German: Der deutsche Vortrupp. Gefolgschaft deutscher Juden) was a German association of pro-Nazi Jewish Germans. It was founded in February 1933 by Hans-Joachim Schoeps and dissolved in December 1935.

Vanguard members were fiercely patriotic Germans who sought recognition as a Jewish political movement within the resurgence of German nationalism. They disdained Eastern European Jews and opposed Marxism, Zionism, and liberalism, while failing to grasp the uncompromising racial nature of Nazi antisemitism.

Some of their members were also part of the larger Association of German National Jews, another group of Jews for Hitler outlawed by the Nazi authorities in 1935. Schoeps went into exile in Sweden at the end of 1938, seven weeks after the Nazi Kristallnacht mobs destroyed most German Jewish businesses and places of worship and just before the organized persecutions of the Jewish people began in earnest.

== History ==
Historian Matthias Hambrock describes the German Vanguard as a "small, quasi-esoteric club" that "consisted almost entirely of 'heads'", i.e. intellectuals and students. According to a Gestapo report, it mostly consisted of "older youths with academic-intellectual interests". The group had 150 student members. Hambrock categorises it as a German Youth Movement.

The organization had an official newspaper called The German Vanguard: Newspaper of a Fellowship of German Jews (German: Der Deutsche Vortrupp: Blätter einer Gefolgschaft Deutscher Juden). In it, Schoeps wrote: "National Socialism saves Germany from destruction; today Germany is experiencing its völkisch renewal" and called for an "acceleration of the absolutely necessary separation of German and non-German Jews as well as the collection of all German-conscious Jews under uniform authoritarian leadership while bypassing the old organizations as much as possible".

The Biographical Manual of German-Speaking Emigration After 1933 to 1945, Volume 2: "Politics, Economics, Public Life", cites Schoeps's cousin Heinz Georg Salomon Frank, a lawyer, as another of the leaders of the German Vanguard. In 1938 Frank published a work on Jewish education. In the same year he emigrated to Canada. He did so by deceiving the local authorities by enlisting as a farmer, a job he nominally practiced from 1938 to 1943. In fact, however, he had no knowledge in the field of agriculture. He later became an active official in various Canadian-Jewish associations.

== See also ==
- Association of German National Jews
- Respectability politics
- Jewish collaboration with Nazi Germany
