= Hans-Joachim Schoeps =

German historian and academic (1909–1980)

Hans-Joachim Schoeps (30 January 1909 Berlin – 8 July 1980 Erlangen) was a German-Jewish historian of religion and religious philosophy. He was professor of religions and religious history at the University of Erlangen. Prior to World War II, Schoeps was leader of The German Vanguard (Der deutsche Vortrupp), an organization of 150 Jewish students, national conservative anti-Zionists who sought total assimilation into the German nation.

== German Vanguard ==
The German Vanguard (Der deutsche Vortrupp), also referred to as "Nazi Jews", was a group of German-Jewish followers of Hitler led by Schoeps. Schoeps wanted to integrate the German Jews into the Nazi Reich. His activities were tolerated by the Nazi regime until the year 1938 when increasing pressure forced him into exile. He fled to Sweden where he spent the remainder of World War II.

== Exile ==
Schoeps went into exile in Falun (in Sweden) at the end of 1938, seven weeks after the Nazi Kristallnacht mobs destroyed most German Jewish businesses and places of worship, just before the organized persecutions of the Jewish people began in earnest. There his two sons were born. His parents were deported to Theresienstadt concentration camp on 4 June 1942. His father died there six months later. From Theresienstadt, his mother was selected for a transport to Auschwitz-Birkenau where she was killed on arrival.

== Return to Germany ==
Schoeps returned to Western Germany after World War II in Autumn 1946. In 1950, he was made a professor of religious history at the University of Erlangen in northern Bavaria. He remained a monarchist and wanted to re-introduce the monarchy in post-war West Germany. He was firmly opposed to the West German student movement after 1967, and published a book in 1972 in which he claimed that Germany was threatened by anarchy.

In 1963, after the Adenauer government rejected a proposal to discard the Nazi-era version of Paragraph 175 criminalizing sexual activity between men, Schoeps, who was bisexual, commented: "For the homosexuals the Third Reich has not yet ended." Günter Grau writes that although not fully accurate, this statement corresponded to the beliefs of homosexual men at the time.

His involvement in the Vortrupp and his personal engagement for the success of the Nazi movement did not become known at Erlangen until 1970. Schoeps was also member of the Deutschland-Stiftung, in which former Nazis were active.

== See also ==
- Association of German National Jews
- Max Naumann
