= Hohler =

Hohler or Höhler is a surname. Notable people with the surname include:

- Albrecht Höhler (1898–1933), German communist
- Beti Hohler (born 1981), Slovenian jurist
- Bob Hohler, American journalist
- Erla Bergendahl Hohler (1937–2019), Norwegian archaeologist
- Franz Hohler (born 1943), Swiss writer
- Gerald Hohler (1862–1934), British barrister and politician
- Gertrud Höhler (born 1941), German literary scholar
- Thomas Hohler (1871–1946), British diplomat
