= Orden wider den tierischen Ernst =

German carnival award

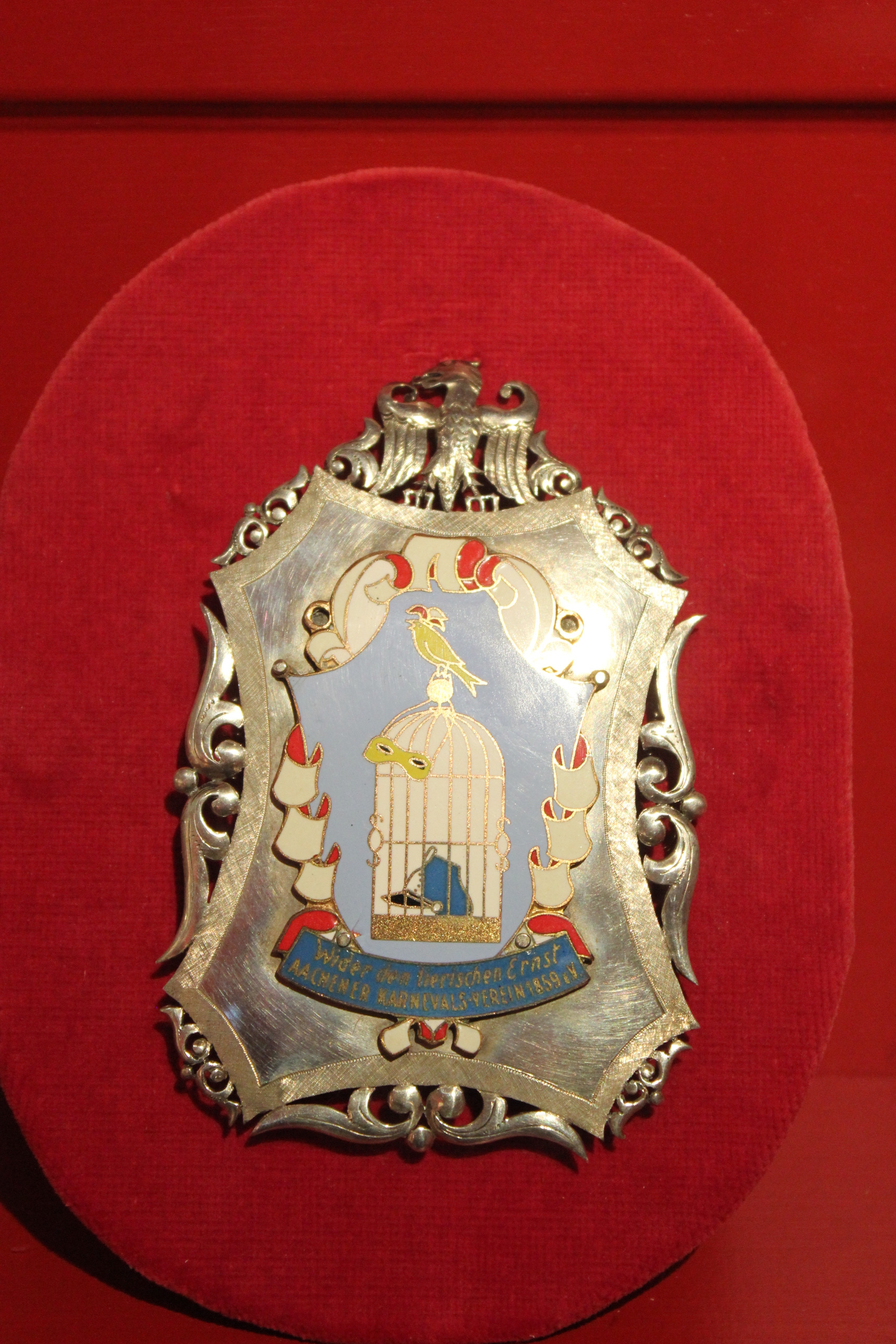
Orden wider den tierischen Ernst

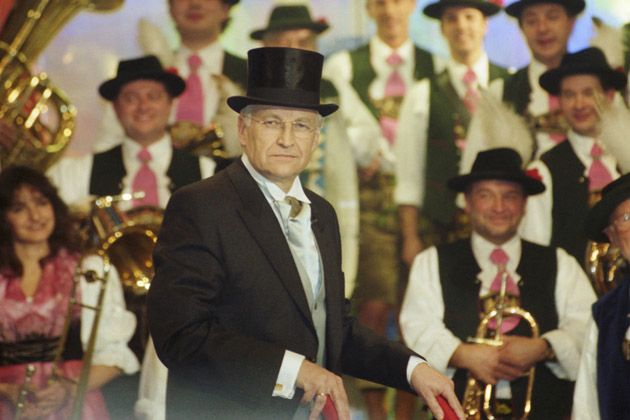
Edmund Stoiber during the awarding of the Orden wider den tierischen Ernst, March 2000

The Orden wider den tierischen Ernst (German for 'Order for Combating Deadly Seriousness') is a carnival order that is awarded once a year by the Aachen Carnival Association to public figures. The order of knights honors people who combine "humor and humanity in office". The popular order has been awarded since 1950. The award ceremony traditionally takes place during a foolish ceremony (närrische Festsitzung). The WDR has been recording the ceremony for the first and third programs since 1995. In 2020 around 2.8 million people across Germany watched.

== Notable recipients ==
- 1955 August Dresbach
- 1957 Max Becker
- 1958 Carlo Schmid
- 1959 Konrad Adenauer
- 1960 Rudolf Eberhard
- 1961 Bruno Kreisky
- 1962 Rochus Spiecker
- 1964 Ewald Bucher
- 1965 Paul Mikat
- 1967 Karl-Günther von Hase
- 1968 Per Hækkerup
- 1969 Hermann Höcherl
- 1970 Denis Healey
- 1971 Josef Ertl and Franz Xaver Unertl (posthum)
- 1972 Helmut Schmidt
- 1974 Walter Scheel
- 1976 Constantin Heereman von Zuydtwyck
- 1978 Ephraim Kishon
- 1979 Hans-Dietrich Genscher
- 1980 Richard Stücklen
- 1982 Manfred Rommel
- 1983 Bernhard Vogel
- 1984 Friedrich Nowottny
- 1985 Norbert Blüm
- 1986 Johannes Rau
- 1987 August Everding
- 1988 Gertrud Höhler
- 1989 Franz Josef Strauß (posthum)
- 1990 Lothar Späth
- 1992 Jack Lang
- 1993 Ruud Lubbers
- 1994 Renate Schmidt
- 1995 Heiner Geißler
- 1997 Theodor Waigel
- 1998 Heide Simonis
- 1999 John C. Kornblum
- 2000 Edmund Stoiber
- 2001 Guido Westerwelle
- 2002 Thomas Borer
- 2003 Wendelin Wiedeking
- 2004 Henning Scherf
- 2005 Karl Lehmann
- 2006 Friedrich Merz
- 2008 Gloria, Princess of Thurn and Taxis
- 2009 Mario Adorf
- 2010 Jürgen Rüttgers
- 2011 Karl-Theodor zu Guttenberg
- 2012 Ottfried Fischer
- 2013 Cem Özdemir
- 2014 Christian Lindner
- 2015 Annegret Kramp-Karrenbauer
- 2016 Markus Söder
- 2017 Gregor Gysi
- 2018 Winfried Kretschmann
- 2019 Julia Klöckner
- 2020 Armin Laschet
- 2022 Iris Berben
- 2023 Annalena Baerbock
- 2024 Daniel Günther
- 2025 Lars Klingbeil
- 2026 Dorothee Bär

== See also ==
- Carnival society
