= Konrad Adenauer Prize =

Awards given by the Germany Foundation

- Sponsored by: Germany Foundation
- Date: 1967–2001
- Country: Germany

The Konrad Adenauer Prize (German: Konrad-Adenauer-Preis) was an award by the Germany Foundation, a national conservative organisation associated with the Christian Democratic Union, from 1967 to 2001. It was given annually between 1973 and 1975, then every two years, with exceptions, from 1975 to 2001. It was given to right-wing intellectuals and was named in memory of statesman and former German Chancellor Konrad Adenauer. The journalism and literary prizes are now both separate prizes altogether.

This is not to be confused with the Konrad-Adenauer-Preis given by the city of Cologne.

== List of prize winners ==
Year	Literature	Science	Journalism	Politics	Freedom Prize	Misc	Refs
1967	Bernt von Heiseler	Ludwig Freund	Armin Mohler				
1968	Frank Thiess	Wilhelm Stählin	Emil Franzel				
1969	Edzard Schaper	Hans-Joachim Schoeps	Felix von Eckhardt				
1970	Manfred Hausmann	Pascual Jordan	Winfried Martini				
1971	Zenta Maurina	Arnold Gehlen	William S. Schlamm				
1972		Ernst Forsthoff	Matthias Walden	Richard von Coudenhove-Kalergi			
1973					Lucius D. Clay		
1975	Vladimir Maximov	Karl Steinbuch	Gerhard Löwenthal				
1977	Hans Habe	Helmut Schelsky	Otto von Habsburg				
1979			Christa Meves				
1981			Axel Cäsar Springer				
1983	Gertrud Fussenegger (declined)						
1984	Vladimir Bukovsky	Peter R. Hofstätter	Herbert Kremp				
1986	Gerd-Klaus Kaltenbrunner	Jean-François Revel					
1988	Gertrud Höhler		Wolfgang Höpker				
1990					Alfred Dregger		
1992	Gabriele Wohmann	Michael Wolffsohn	Jens Feddersen				
1993					Václav Klaus		
1994					Helmut Kohl		
1996	Lutz Rathenow	Hans-Peter Schwarz	Heinz Klaus Mertes				
1998					Wolfgang Schäuble		
2000	Otfried Preussler	Ernst Nolte					
2001						Peter Maffay (culture)	
