= Hillel Zeitlin =

Polish Jewish writer, poet and philosopher in Yiddish and Hebrew

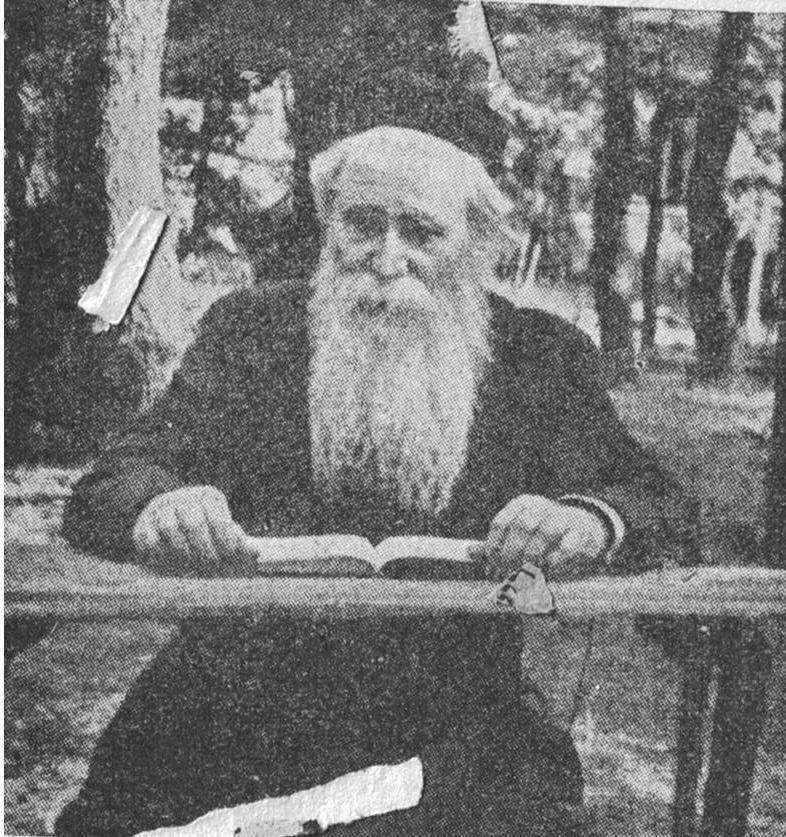
- Born: 1871; Mogilev Governorate, Russian Empire
- Died: September 11, 1942 (aged 70–71); Warsaw Ghetto, Nazi German-occupied Poland

Philosophical work
- Era: 20th-century philosophy
- Region: Jewish philosophy
- School: Neo-Hasidism; Jewish existentialism Hasidic philosophy Neo-romanticism (early)

Hillel Zeitlin (Hilel Cajtlin, הלל צייַטלין, 1871–1942) was a Polish Ashkenazi Yiddish and Hebrew writer and poet. A leading pre-Holocaust Jewish journalist, he was a regular contributor to the Yiddish newspaper Moment, among other literary activities. He was the leading thinker in the movement of pre-World War II "philosophical Neo-Hasidism".

== Biography ==
He was born in Korma, in the Mogilev Governorate of the Russian Empire (present-day Gomel Region of Belarus), to a Hasidic Chabad family. In childhood, studying at first under his father, Aaron-Eliezer, he garnered recognition for his remarkable memory and grasp of the rabbinic material before his eleventh birthday. He subsequently studied with the local Hasidic teacher and, for the last year before his bar mitzvah, at the court of the Hasidic rebbe in the town of Rechitsa (in the adjacent Minsk Governorate). After his father died in 1887, Hillel Zeitlin, at the age of 16, embarked on travels through the Jewish villages of the Pale of Settlement, earning his living as a Hebrew teacher.

His exit from the world of the Yeshiva exposed him to the works of the scholars of the Enlightenment. He began studying in earnest the works of both Jewish philosophers (Maimonides, Gersonides, Spinoza etc.) and non-Jewish ones such as Schopenhauer, Nietzsche and others. During this period in his life, he began questioning his religious beliefs and eventually drifted toward secularism.

After World War I, Zeitlin gradually returned to tradition and began leading an Orthodox lifestyle. The reason(s) for this drastic change in his life is not completely clear but may have had something to do with the suffering of Jews during the war. In any case, he shifted from a tragic philosophical outlook to a mystical and spiritual viewpoint. One of Zeitlin's mystical essays prompted a booklet in opposition by Rabbi Yiḥyah Qafiḥ. Zeitlin's shift notwithstanding, he remained independent and unconventional in his beliefs and actions. He did not, for instance, hesitate to eulogize his former friend the great writer and thinker Yosef Haim Brenner, who was an ardent secularist.

Zeitlin quoted a wide variety of Hasidic sources, but did not live in a Hasidic community or identify with a particular Hasidic group (although he did visit several prominent Hasidic Rebbes). Zeitlin endeavored to preserve what he called the "treasure" at the core of Hasidic teaching (which he considered to be obscured in his day by pseudo-intellectual trivialities and excessive concern for outward appearance), and to make it accessible not only to Jews of his era but to non-Jews. He considered the core of Hasidim to consist of three "loves": love of God, of Torah, and of Israel. Just as his intended audience consisted of assimilated Jews and non-Jews, he adopted novel formulations of these loves: "love of Torah" would come to encompass inspiring works of "secular" art and literature, while "love of Israel" would be transformed into "love of humanity" (despite which Israel would still be recognized as the "firstborn child of God"). Zeitlin's religious ideal also contained a socialist element: the Hasidim he pictured would refuse to take advantage of workers.

Zeitlin also grew close to the territorialist movement and lent his support to the "Uganda proposal". Zeitlin was of the opinion that it would be impossible to settle in Palestine without removing the half a million Palestinian Arabs and so the Zionist proposals would fail. He was a practical territorialist and his writings took on more urgency after the notorious pogroms in Kishinev and Homel.

When the Nazi Germans began the genocide of Jewish People in German-occupied Poland in 1942, Zeitlin was 71 years old. He was murdered by Nazi Germans in the Warsaw Ghetto while holding a book of the Zohar and wrapped in a Tallit and Tefillin. Most of his family was also murdered; the only survivor was his elder son Aaron, who had settled in New York in 1939.

His sons, Aaron Zeitlin (1898-1973) and Elchanan Zeitlin (1902-1942), were also Yiddish writers.

== See also ==
- Martin Buber
- Abraham Joshua Heschel
- Zalman Schachter-Shalomi

== Bibliography ==
- Bar-On, Shraga, "Hillel Zeitlin in Search of God: An Analysis of Zeitlin's Meditation ‘The Thirst’", in: D. Schwartz and A. Sagi (eds.), Faith: Jewish Perspectives (Boston: Academic Studies Press, 2013), pp. 478-499.
- Green, Arthur (2012). Hasidic Spirituality for a New Era: The Religious Writings of Hillel Zeitlin. The Classics of Western Spirituality. New York: Paulist Press.
- Holtz, Avraham (1970). Hillel Zeitlin, publicist and martyr : on the occasion of his 100th birthday. New York?: Publisher not identified.
- Meir, Jonatan; Glauber-Zimra, Samuel (2023). "From the pages of Tradition : Hillel Zeitlin's "On Select Redeemers"". Tradition; a Journal of Orthodox Jewish Thought. 55 (1): 98–106.
- Meir, Jonatan, "Hillel Zeitlin's Zohar: The History of a Translation and Commentary Project", Kabbalah: Journal for the Study of Jewish Mystical Texts 10 (2004): pp. 119–157. In Hebrew.
- Shapira, Anita (1999). Land and Power: The Zionist Resort to Force, 1881-1948. Stanford University Press. ISBN 0-8047-3776-2.
- Zeitlin, Hillel; Meir, Jonatan (2006). Rabbi Nahman of Bratslav: World Weariness and Longing for the Messiah. Two essays by Hillel Zeitlin; introduction and critical notes by Jonatan Meir. Yeriot: Essays and Papers in the Jewish Studies Bearing on the Humanities and the Social Sciences, no. 5. Jerusalem: Ornah Hes. In Hebrew.
