= Friedrich Nowottny =

German television journalist (born 1929)

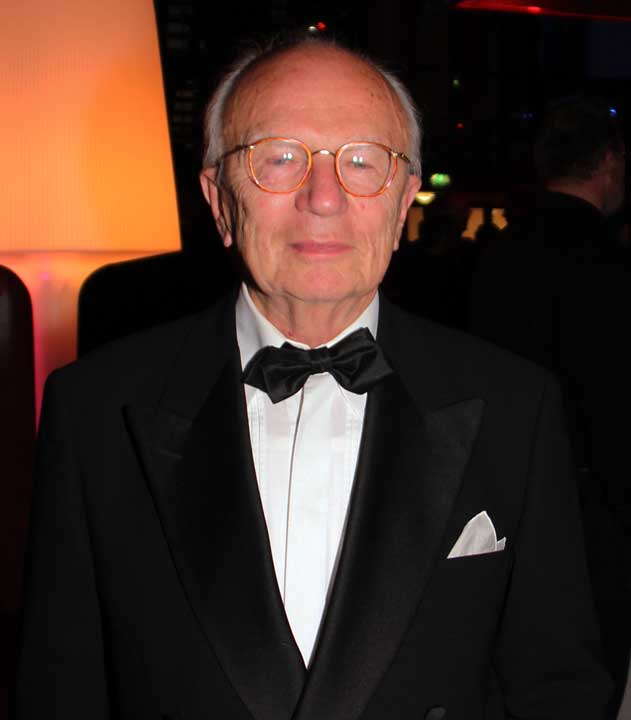
- Nowottny at the Deutscher Fernsehpreis in 2012
- Born: 16 May 1929 (age 96); Hindenburg, Germany (now Zabrze, Poland)
- Occupation: Television journalist

Friedrich Nowottny (born 16 May 1929) is a German television journalist.

== Life ==
Nowottny worked as director of German broadcaster WDR. He lives in Swisttal-Buschhoven near Bonn.

== Awards ==
- 1973: Goldene Kamera in category Politischer Journalist u. Kommentator
- 1976: Bambi Award
- 1980: Goldener Gong for his moderation at Bundestagswahl 1980
- 1982: Goldene Kamera in category Bester Politik-Moderator
- 1984: Orden wider den tierischen Ernst of Aachener Karnevalverein
- 1985: Goldener Gong for his 571th moderation of Bericht aus Bonn
- 1986: Großes Bundesverdienstkreuz
- 2005: Steiger Award
- 2006: Deutscher Fernsehpreis Ehrenpreis der Stifter
