= Landwirtschaftliche Rentenbank =

- Type: Federal Institution under Public Law
- Industry: Finance and Insurance
- Founded: 1949
- Headquarters: Frankfurt am Main, Germany
- Key people: Management Board: Dr. Horst Reinhardt (Chairman), Dietmar Ilg, Dr. Marc Kaninke
- Products: Financial services
- Total assets: 90.2 billion EUR (2018 YE)
- Number of employees: 304 (2018)
- Website: www.rentenbank.de

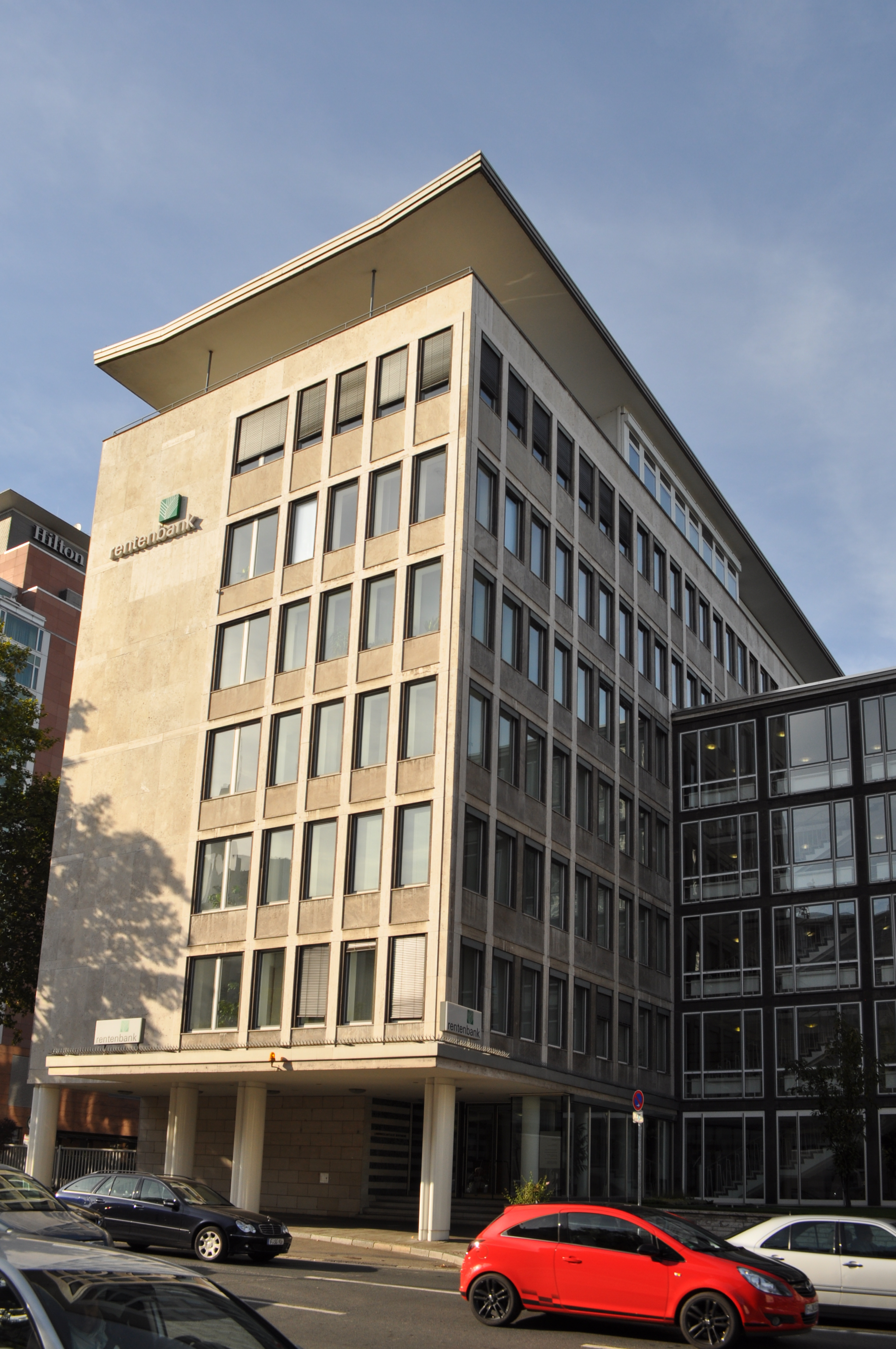
Frankfurt, Rentenbank, Seitenflügel

Landwirtschaftliche Rentenbank is Germany's development agency for agribusiness and rural areas. The bank has its registered office in Frankfurt am Main. In 2019 it will be 70 years since it was founded. With its low-interest loans, Rentenbank promotes a wide range of investments in agriculture and the associated upstream and downstream industries as well as in rural areas. The funds are raised in the international capital markets. Rentenbank was established in 1949 as a central funding institution with a statutory promotional mandate. The Federal Republic of Germany has an institutional liability (Anstaltslast) and acts as a guarantor for the liabilities of Rentenbank. Rentenbank is a successor to Deutsche Rentenbank, established as the currency issuer of the Rentenmark in 1923 to combat hyperinflation, and Deutsche Rentenbank Kreditanstalt (RKA), a major lender in the agricultural sector formed in 1925. With total assets under management in the amount of around EUR 90 billion, Rentenbank counts among the 15 largest banks and is the third largest development bank in Germany. Rentenbank is under the supervision of the Federal Financial Supervisory Authority(BaFin) and Deutsche Bundesbank.

== Promoting agribusiness, rural areas and history ==
Rentenbank’s special promotional loans are geared towards businesses in the agricultural, horticultural, viticultural and silvicultural sectors, including manufacturers of agricultural input materials as well as agriculture-related trade and service companies. The bank also finances projects in the food industry and the associated upstream and downstream industries. Further, Rentenbank promotes civic engagement and public-sector investments in rural areas. The bank’s statutory promotional mandate explicitly includes promoting renewable energy, renewable agricultural resources, organic farming, agriculture-related environmental and consumer protection, and animal welfare. The loans are extended via local banks on a competitively neutral basis. In addition, Rentenbank awards grants for innovations and applied research projects, as well as for projects and institutions that are of particular importance to agribusiness and rural areas. Rentenbank’s Rehwinkel Foundation supports scientific research, promotes events that foster collaboration between agricultural science and industry, and awards scholarships to students on relevant Master’s programmes. Rentenbank focuses its efforts on promoting innovation, in particular start-ups that are developing new, tech-based business ideas that can play a vital role in driving innovation in agriculture.

From 1974 to 1998 Constantin Heereman von Zuydtwyck was president of Landwirtschaftliche Rentenbank.

== Funding ==
Rentenbank funds its promotional business primarily in the international capital markets through loans and the issuance of securities. The bank’s most important funding instruments comprise the Euro Medium Term Note (EMTN) programme, the Euro Commercial Paper (ECP) programme, as well as global bonds that are registered with SEC, the US stock market regulator. The bank’s issues are mostly denominated in US dollars and euros. The three major rating agencies have assigned their highest ratings (AAA and Aaa) to Rentenbank’s long-term obligations.

== See also ==
- List of banks in Germany
