= Gertrud Höhler =

German literary scholar, management consultant and political consultant

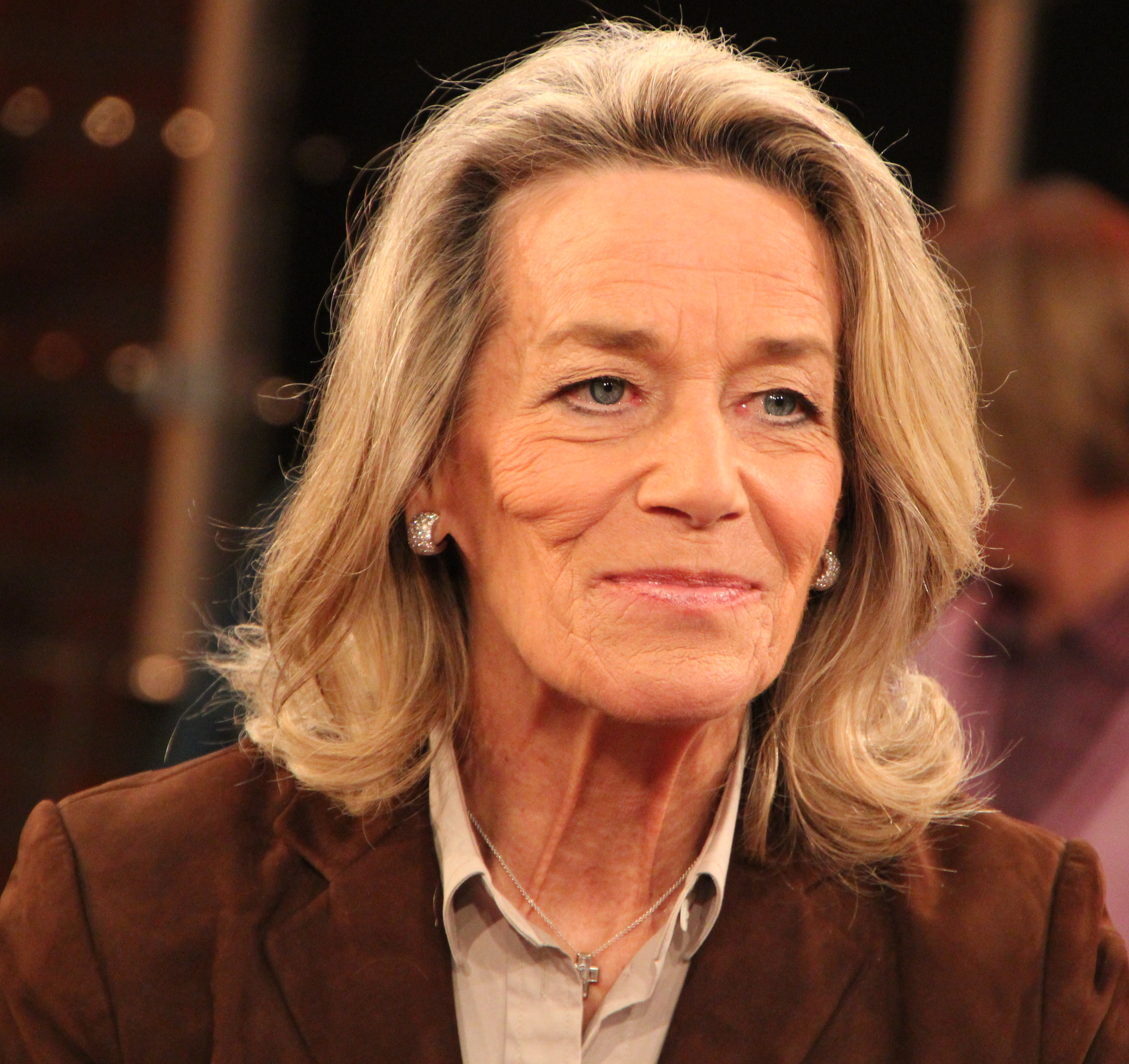
- Born: Gertrud Höhler; 10 January 1941 (age 85); Wuppertal, Germany
- Education: University of Bonn; Free University of Berlin; University of Zurich; University of Mannheim
- Occupations: Professor, management consultant, political consultant
- Children: 1

Gertrud Höhler (born 10 January 1941) is a German literary scholar, management consultant and political consultant.

== Early life ==
Höhler was born in Wuppertal, Germany, and is the second of four children of parish priest Heinrich Höhler (1907–1995) and his wife Helene, daughter of the theologian Fritz Horn. The German cardiologist Mia Helene Höhler (1939–2020) was her sister; the German architect Ernst Höhler (1942–2019) was her brother.

Höhler graduated from high school in Wuppertal. She then studied literature studies and art history in Bonn, Berlin, Zurich and Mannheim from 1960 to 1966. Her studies were supported by a scholarship from the German Academic Scholarship Foundation. In 1967 she was awarded her doctorate with a thesis on Unruhige Gäste. Das Bibelzitat in Wilhelm Raabes Roman (The Biblical Quotation in Wilhelm Raabe's Novel Unruhige Gäste), and worked at the University of Mannheim.

== Career ==
In 1972, at the age of 31, Höhler was appointed to the founding senate of the University of Paderborn as an academic councilor.

From 1976 to 1993, Höhler was Professor of German Studies and General Literature Studies at the University of Paderborn. In 1993, she resigned her professorship in Paderborn to work as a freelance publicist and management consultant. In addition, Höhler was a Fellow of the Berlin Institute for Advanced Study as well as a member of the Senate of the Fraunhofer Society.

From 1987 to 1989, Höhler was a consultant to Alfred Herrhausen, the chairman of the board of Deutsche Bank. In addition, Carl Hahn engaged her as a consultant for Volkswagen. While working for Deutsche Bank, she served as a consultant for other associations and companies and was on leave from her professorial duties.

Höhler also consulted, among others, for the British company Grand Metropolitan, the Swiss insurance holding company Bâloise, the chemical company Ciba and the engineering company Georg Fischer.

Höhler gained international fame through numerous publications as well as media appearances in which she took a stand on current political and economic issues. She also became known to the public for her political consulting activities, such as for Thuringia's Minister President Dieter Althaus and German Chancellor Helmut Kohl.

Höhler is a member of the CDU. In the 1980s, she was considered several times as a candidate for a federal ministerial office in Kohl's cabinets, including the office of Federal Minister for Youth, Family and Health. From 1986 to 1993, Höhler was a member of the Advisory Council to the Federal Ministry of Defence on Issues of Inner Leadership.

Höhler was host of the sociopolitical talk show Baden-Badener Disput – Kulturgespräch zur Zeit (SWR) from 1988 to 2000, which had a total of 58 episodes.

Höhler published titles such as Wölfin unter Wölfen. Warum Männer ohne Frauen Fehler machen (2000), Warum Vertrauen siegt (2003) sowie Jenseits der Gier. Vom Luxus des Teilens (2005).

In various books such as Die Patin. Wie Angela Merkel Deutschland umbaut (The Godmother. How Angela Merkel is Rebuilding Germany) (2012), Demokratie im Sinkflug: Wie sich Angela Merkel und EU-Politiker über geltendes Recht stellen (Democracy in decline: How Angela Merkel and EU politicians place themselves above applicable law) (2017) or Angela Merkel – Das Requiem (Angela Merkel – The Requiem) (2020) and media appearances she presented herself as a harsh critic of German Chancellor Angela Merkel.

== Personal life ==
During the 1960s Höhler belonged to the left-wing subcultural milieu. She was in a relationship with the German screenwriter and film director Ulf Miehe (with whom she self-published a book of poems in 1962).

Höhler is single and has a son, Abel Rainer Daniel (born 1967 in Baden, Switzerland), who is also a management consultant. She lives in Dahlem, a district of Berlin, and at Obersee, St. Gallen.

== Honors and awards ==
- 1964 Eduard von der Heydt Culture Prize of the city of Wuppertal (poetry promotion prize)
- 1988 Konrad Adenauer Prize of the Germany Foundation
- 1988 Orden wider den tierischen Ernst
- 1993 Prize of the Foundation for Occidental Ethics and Culture
- 1999 Federal Cross of Merit 1st Class of the Order of Merit of the Federal Republic of Germany
- 2002 German Fairness Prize

== Publications ==
- Gedichte, with Ulf Miehe, Sphinx, Bad Salzuflen 1962
- Unruhige Gäste. Das Bibelzitat in Wilhelm Raabes Roman, 1969 (dissertation)
- Gesinnungskonkurrenz der Intellektuellen, Osnabrück 1978
- Niemandes Sohn. Zur Poetologie Rainer Maria Rilkes. Fink, München 1979
- Die Anspruchsgesellschaft. Von den zwiespältigen Träumen unserer Zeit. Econ, Düsseldorf 1979
- Das Glück. Analyse einer Sehnsucht, Düsseldorf 1981
- Die Kinder der Freiheit, Stuttgart 1983
- Die Bäume des Lebens, Stuttgart 1985
- Die Zukunftsgesellschaft, Düsseldorf 1986
- Spielregeln des Glücks, Düsseldorf 1988
- Offener Horizont. Junge Strategien verändern die Welt, Düsseldorf 1988
- Virtuosen des Abschieds / Neue Werte für eine Welt im Wandel, Düsseldorf 1989
- Spielregeln für Sieger, Düsseldorf 1991
- Wettspiele der Macht. Econ, Düsseldorf 1994 (new edition: Ullstein 2005. ISBN 3-548-36731-3)
- Herzschlag der Sieger. Die EQ-Revolution. Econ, Düsseldorf 1997 (new edition: Ullstein 2004. ISBN 3-548-36668-6)
- Der veruntreute Sündenfall, with Michael G. Koch, Stuttgart 1998
- EntZweiung oder neues Bündnis?, Stuttgart 1998
- Wölfin unter Wölfen. Warum Männer ohne Frauen Fehler machen. Econ Ullstein List, München 2000 (2004. ISBN 3-548-36499-3)
- Die Sinn-Macher. Wer siegen will, muss führen. Econ Ullstein List, München 2002 (2004. ISBN 3-548-36499-3)
- Warum Vertrauen siegt. Ullstein Heyne List, München 2003 (new edition: Tb Ullstein 2005. ISBN 3-548-36717-8)
- Jenseits der Gier. Vom Luxus des Teilens, Berlin 2005
- Aufstieg für alle. Was die Gewinner den Verlierern schulden. Econ, Berlin 2007; Ullstein, Berlin 2009, ISBN 978-3-548-37247-1
- Das Ende der Schonzeit. Alphafrauen an die Macht. Econ, Berlin 2008, ISBN 978-3-430-20050-9
- Götzendämmerung. Die Geldreligion frisst ihre Kinder. Heyne, München 2010, ISBN 978-3-453-17796-3
- Die Patin. Wie Angela Merkel Deutschland umbaut. Orell Füssli, Zürich 2012, ISBN 978-3-280-05480-2
- Demokratie im Sinkflug: Wie sich Angela Merkel und EU-Politiker über geltendes Recht stellen. FinanzBuch, München 2017, ISBN 978-3-959-72063-2
- Angela Merkel – Das Requiem, Ullstein, Berlin 2020, ISBN 978-3-430-21027-0
- Die Corona-Bilanz. Die Würde des Menschen ist unantastbar, Heyne, München 2020, ISBN 978-3-453-60590-9
