= Edzard Schaper =

German author

- Born: 30 September 1908
- Died: 29 January 1984 (aged 75)
- Occupation: German writer

Edzard Schaper (30 September 1908 – 29 January 1984) was a German author. Many of his works describe the persecution of Christians.

== Awards ==
- 1967 Gottfried-Keller-Preis
- 1969 Konrad Adenauer Prize for literature

== Works ==
- Der letzte Gast. Bonz, Stuttgart 1927.
- Die Bekenntnisse des Försters Patrik Doyle. Bonz, Stuttgart 1928.
- Die Insel Tütarsaar. Insel, Leipzig 1933.
- Erde über dem Meer. Roman einer kämpfenden Jugend. Die Buchgemeinde, Berlin 1934.
- Die sterbende Kirche. Insel, Leipzig 1935.
- Der Henker. Insel, Leipzig 1940; durchgesehene Neuausgabe: Artemis, Zürich 1978, ISBN 3-7608-0492-6.
- Der letzte Advent. Atlantis, Freiburg 1949.
- Die Freiheit des Gefangenen. Hegner, Köln 1950.
- Die Macht der Ohnmächtigen. Hegner, Köln 1952.
- Der Gouverneur oder Der glückselige Schuldner. Hegner, Köln 1954.
- Die letzte Welt. Hegner, Köln 1956.
- Attentat auf den Mächtigen. Fischer, Frankfurt am Main 1957
- Das Tier oder Die Geschichte eines Bären, der Oskar hieß. Fischer, Frankfurt am Main 1958.
- Der vierte König. Hegner, Köln 1961
  - Daraus als Einzelausgabe: Die Legende vom vierten König. Mit Zeichnungen von Celestino Piatti. Hegner, Köln 1964; Artemis & Winkler, Düsseldorf 2008, ISBN 978-3-538-06360-0.
- Der Aufruhr des Gerechten. Eine Chronik. Hegner, Köln 1963.
- Am Abend der Zeit. Hegner, Köln 1970.
- Taurische Spiele. Hegner, Köln 1971.
- Sperlingsschlacht. Hegner, Köln 1972.
- Degenhall. Artemis, Zürich 1975.
- Die Reise unter den Abendstern.
- Die Arche, die Schiffbruch erlitt. Insel Verlag, Leipzig 1935 (Insel-Bücherei 471/1)
- Das Lied der Väter. Insel Verlag, Leipzig 1937 (Insel-Bücherei 514/1)
- Die Heiligen Drei Könige. Arche, Zürich 1945
- Semjon, der ausging, das Licht zu holen. Eine Weihnachtserzählung aus dem alten Estland. Reinhardt, Basel 1947.
  - Neuausgabe als: Stern über der Grenze. Hegner, Köln 1950.
- Der große offenbare Tag. Die Erzählung eines Freundes. Summa, Olten 1949; Reclam (UB 8018), Stuttgart 1972, ISBN 3-15-008018-5.
- Norwegische Reise. Arche, Zürich 1951.
- Das Christkind aus den großen Wäldern. Mit 10 Zeichnungen von Richard Seewald. Hegner, Köln 1954; Artemis & Winkler, Zürich 1998, ISBN 3-7608-0954-5
- Nikodemus. Arche, Zürich 1952.
- Hinter den Linien. Erzählungen. Hegner, Köln 1952.
- Der Mantel der Barmherzigkeit. Hegner, Köln 1953.
- Um die neunte Stunde oder Nikodemus und Simon. Hegner, Köln 1953.
- Das Wiedersehen und Der gekreuzigte Diakon. Hegner, Köln 1957.
- Unschuld der Sünde. Fischer, Frankfurt am Main 1957.
- Die Eidgenossen des Sommers. Die Nachfahren Petri. Zwei Erzählungen. Hegner, Köln 1958.
- Die Geisterbahn. Hegner, Köln 1959; als dtv-Taschenbuch, München 1968.
- Die Söhne Hiobs. Hegner, Köln 1962.
- Dragonergeschichte. Novelle. Hegner, Köln 1963.
- Schicksale und Abenteuer. Geschichten aus vielen Leben. Zehn neue Erzählungen. Hegner, Köln 1968.
- Schattengericht. Vier neue Erzählungen. Hegner, Köln 1967.
- Die Heimat der Verbannten. Hegner, Köln 1968.
- Der Mensch in der Zelle. Dichtung und Deutung des gefangenen Menschen. Hegner, Köln 1951.
- Vom Sinn des Alters. Eine Betrachtung. Arche, Zürich 1952.
- Untergang und Verwandlung. Betrachtungen und Reden. Arche, Zürich 1952.
- Erkundungen in gestern und morgen. Arche, Zürich 1956.
- Bürger in Zeit und Ewigkeit. Antworten. Marion von Schröder, Hamburg 1956.
- Der Abfall vom Menschen. Zwei Vorträge. Walter, Olten 1961.
- Verhüllte Altäre. Ansprachen. Hegner, Köln 1962.
- Flucht und Bleibe. Ein Wort an die geflüchteten und vertriebenen Deutschen. Hegner, Köln 1965.
- Wagnis der Gegenwart. Essays. Kreuz, Stuttgart 1965.
- Die baltischen Länder im geistigen Spektrum Europas. Ein Vortrag, 1965.
- Über die Redlichkeit. Essay. Hegner, Köln 1967.
- Das Leben Jesu. Insel, Leipzig 1936.
  - Daraus als Einzelausgabe: Die Weihnachtsgeschichte. Arche, Zürich 1950.
- Der Held. Weg und Wahn Karl XII., 1958
- Der Gefangene der Botschaft. Drei Stücke (mit Strenger Abschied. und Die Kosaken oder wo ist dein Bruder Abel). Nachwort von Max Wehrli. Hegner, Köln 1964
- Das Feuer Christi. Leben und Sterben des Johannes Hus in siebzehn dramatischen Szenen. Kreuz, Stuttgart 1965
- Macht und Freiheit. Zwei Romane (Die Freiheit des Gefangenen – Die Macht der Ohnmächtigen). Hegner (Die Bücher der Neunzehn 82), Köln 1961; Kerle, Freiburg 1983, ISBN 3-600-30105-5.
- Gesammelte Erzählungen. Hegner, Köln 1965.
- Aufstand und Ergebung. 3 Romane (Attentat auf den Mächtigen – Die letzte Welt – Der Aufruhr des Gerechten). Hegner, Köln 1973, ISBN 3-7764-0208-3.
- Geschichten aus vielen Leben. Sämtliche Erzählungen. Artemis, Zürich 1977.
- Grenzlinien. Eine Auswahl aus seinem Werk. Hrsg. von Matthias Wörther. Essay von Werner Ross. Artemis, Zürich 1987, ISBN 3-7608-0700-3.
