= Constantin Heereman von Zuydtwyck =

German farmer and politician (1931–2017)

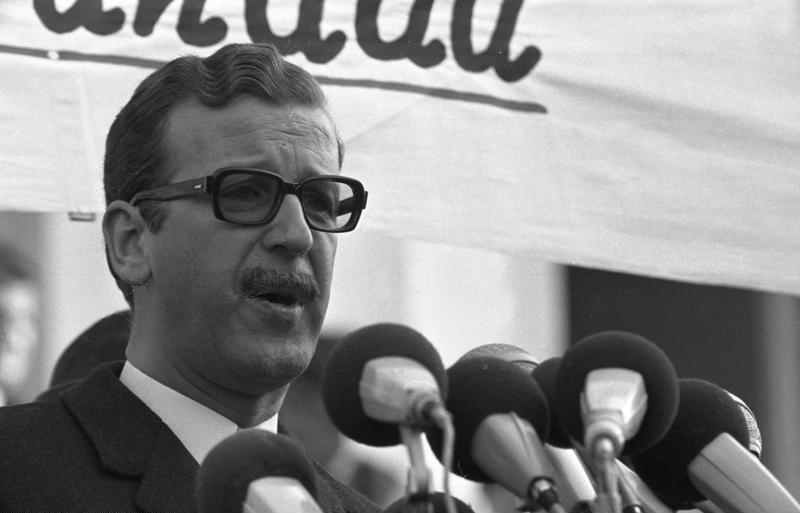
Constantin Freiherr Heereman von Zuydtwyck, 1971 in Bonn

Constantin Heereman von Zuydtwyck (17 December 1931 in Münster – 26 July 2017 in Riesenbeck-Hörstel) was a German farmer and politician.

== Life ==
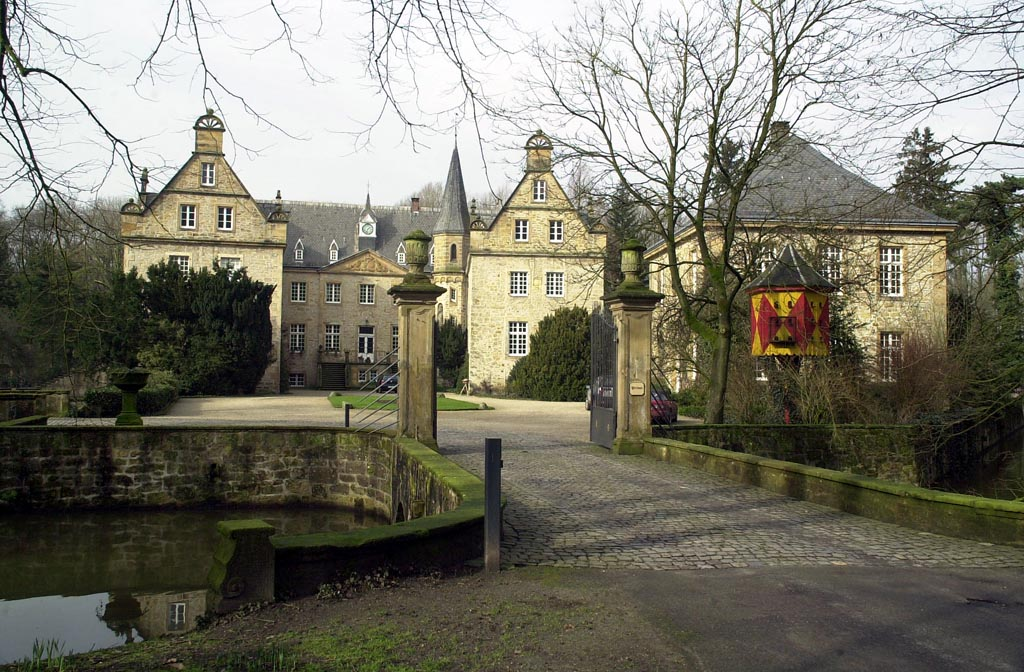
Surenburg in Hörstel/Riesenbeck

He went to school at Aloisiuskolleg in Bonn. Heereman von Zuydtwyck was member of Christian Democratic Union of Germany. From 1967 to 1979 Heereman von Zuydtwyck was president of Deutscher Bauernverband. From 1995 to 2003 he was president of Deutscher Jagdverband. From 1983 to 1990 Heereman von Zuydtwyck was member of German Bundestag. He was from 1974 to 1998 president of Landwirtschaftliche Rentenbank Since 1956 he was married with Margarethe Freiin von Wrede-Melschede (1931–2007). He had four daughters and a son Philipp Freiherr Heereman von Zuydtwyck.

== Awards ==
- 1976: Orden wider den tierischen Ernst
- 1973: Order of Merit of the Federal Republic of Germany
- 1966: Decoration of Honour for Services to the Republic of Austria
