= Columbia concentration camp =

Concentration camp in Nazi Germany

Coordinates: 52°29′1″N 13°23′57″E

Columbia concentration camp (also known as Columbia-Haus) was a Nazi concentration camp situated in the Tempelhof area of Berlin. It was one of the first such institutions established by the regime.

== Development ==
Photograph of the camp in operation, shown on a memorial plaque

Originally called Strafgefängnis Tempelhofer Feld, the building, which contained 134 cells, 10 interrogation rooms and a guardroom, had been built as a military police station but fell empty in 1929. However, as soon as the Nazi Party came to power, the building, by then known as Columbia-Haus, was made into a prison, with 400 inmates held by September 1933.

The prison, initially staffed by both Schutzstaffel and Sturmabteilung members, was largely unregulated until 1934 when it was placed under the command of Walter Gerlach and his adjutant Arthur Liebehenschel. Run as a prison by the Gestapo, it was notorious in the city for the torture meted out to its detainees, most of whom were communists, Social Democrats, or Jews, including the rightist Max Naumann who spent time as an inmate.

From 27 December 1934 the prison was administrated by the Concentration Camps Inspectorate. On 8 January 1935 Reinhard Heydrich announced that Konzentrationslager Columbia was to be adopted as the official name, in preference to Columbia-Haus.

== Personnel ==
Many leading perpetrators of the Holocaust saw service in Columbia early in their careers. Notable amongst these was Karl Otto Koch, who was appointed commandant in 1935. At lower levels camp guards included Richard Baer, Max Kögel and Theodor Dannecker.

== Closure and legacy ==
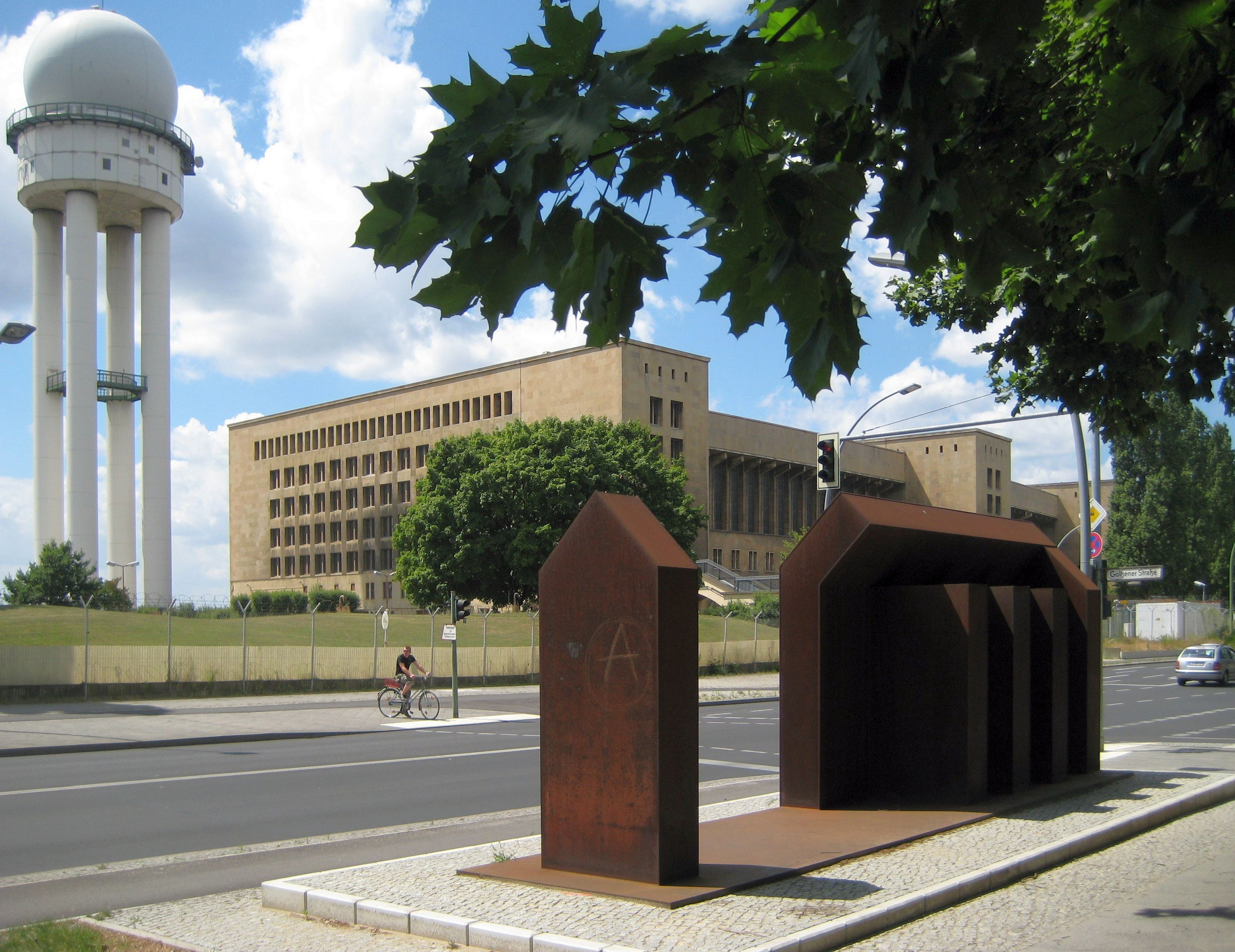
KZ Columbia Memorial, diagonally opposite to its former site now covered by the airport building

The camp was closed in 1936 to make way for the expansion of Berlin Tempelhof Airport. After its closure in August the remaining prisoners were moved to the new facility established at Sachsenhausen.

A motion was passed by Tempelhof district city council to lay a plaque on the site of the camp. The memorial was installed in 1994.
