= Rochus Spiecker =

German writer and Dominican theologian

Father Rochus Spiecker (born Johann Wolfgang Spiecker July 24, 1921 in Berlin – February 20, 1968) was a German writer and Dominican theologian, also active as a radio play and screenwriter. In 1952 Spiecker was entrusted as Bundeskurat (national curate) with the pastoral care of the 14- to 16-year-old Scout level members in the Deutsche Pfadfinderschaft Sankt Georg (DPSG). Through 1958, he influenced the theological development of the DPSG, including through publications in national newspapers and the book "Der Ungeheure und die Abenteurer".

== Publications ==
Spiecker’s books include;

- A Little Bit of Wickedness, 1962
- Plays Between Day and Dream, 1962
- Time in the Mirror, 1964
- Jeanette or The Good Despair, 1977
- Taken at its Word
