= Tales of the Hasidim =

Book of collected tales by Martin Buber

Tales of the Hasidim is a book of collected tales by Martin Buber. It is based on stories—both written and spoken—based in the Hasidim. Buber wrote these tales based on the lore of the Baal Shem Tov. Many of the stories are parables passed down via both the written and spoken word.

== History ==
Tales of the Hasidim was originally published in Hebrew by Schocken Press in Israel in 1946 under the title Or HaGanuz. It was translated into English by Olga Marx and published in 1947.

Buber's collection includes a focus on the theme of non-judgment. Rebbes in the work often chastise followers for pious behavior and reward those who keep the spirit and tradition of Judaism alive. Some of the tales in the book (sometimes referred to as "The Early Masters") constitute mysticism. Buber intended to show how important a sense of community was to the Hasidim rather than expound dogma, although Chaim Potok remarked that Buber "romanticized" his subjects.

== See also ==
- Hasidic Judaism
- Martin Buber
- Kabbalah
