= Eastern European Jewry =

Bloc of Jewish diasporas

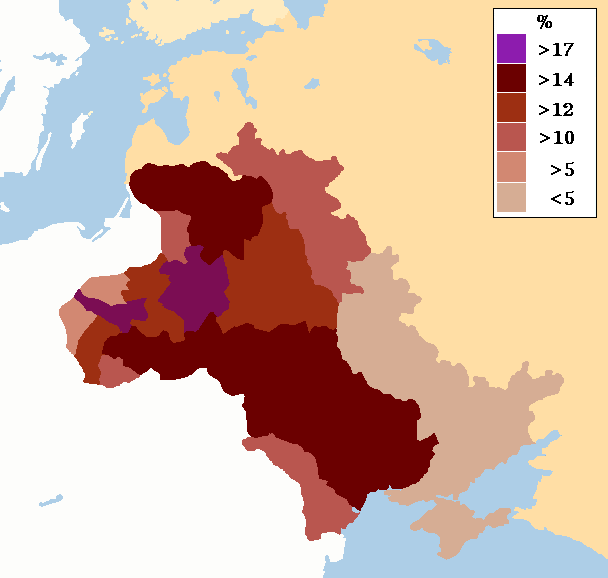
The density of the Jewish settlement in the Russian Empire in 1905

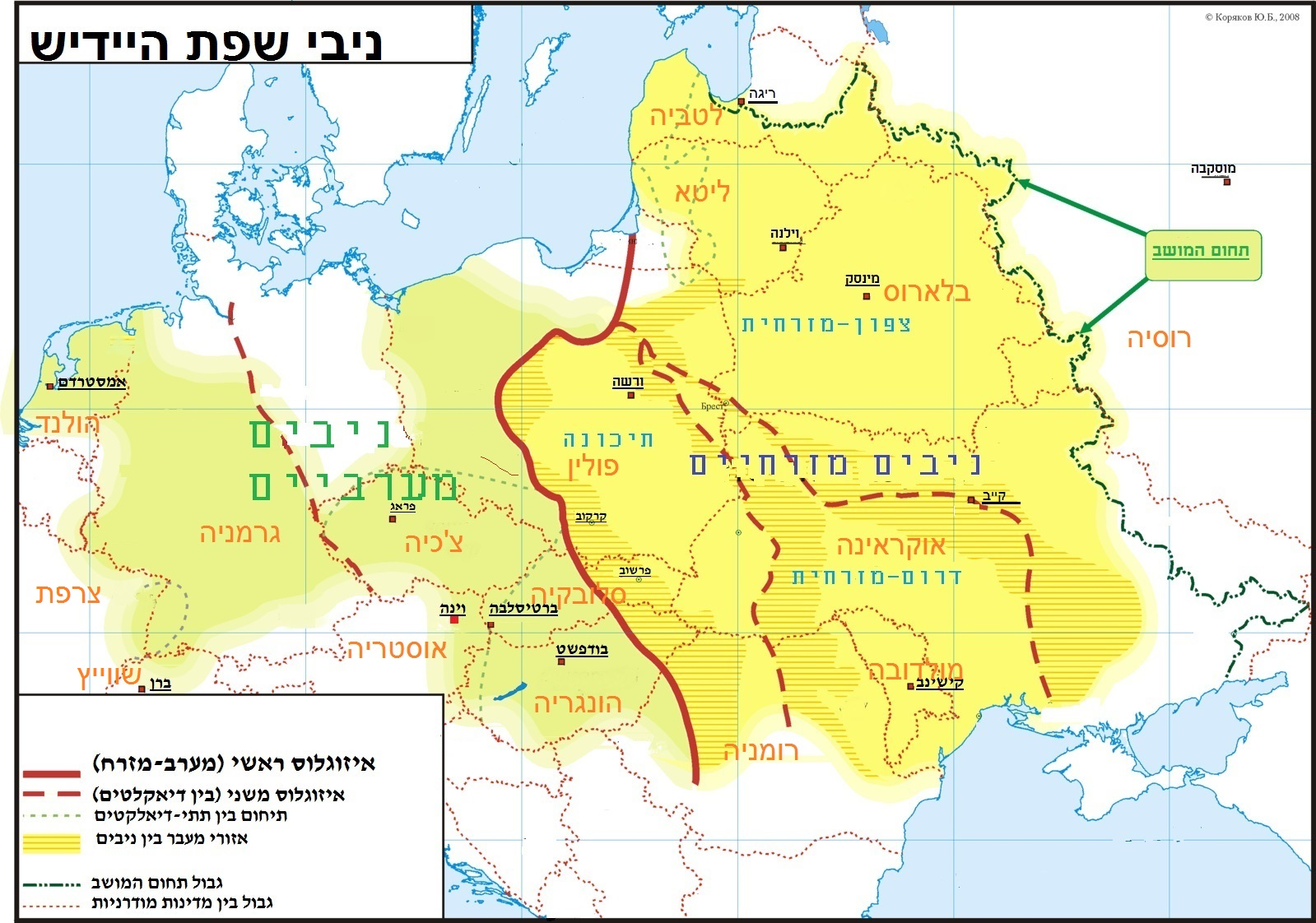
The Hebrew text in this map says the thick red line is the main boundary between eastern (yellow) and western (green) Yiddish dialects, the dash red lines are secondary boundaries between local dialects, and the dotted red lines are modern state borders. The dash-dot line in the east delineates the Pale of Settlement

The expression Eastern European Jewry can either refer to the current political spheres of the Eastern European countries or to the Jewish communities in Russia and Poland.

The phrase 'Eastern European Jews' or 'Jews of the East' (from German: Ostjuden) was established during the 20th century in the German Empire and in the western provinces of the Austro-Hungarian Empire, aiming to distinguish the integrating Jews in Central Europe from those Jews who lived in the East.

This feature deals with the second meaning of the concept of Eastern European Jewry—the Jewish groups that lived in Poland, Ukraine, Belarus, Latvia, Lithuania, Estonia, Russia, Romania, Hungary and modern-day Moldova in collective settlement (from Hebrew: Kibbutz- קיבוץ), many of whom spoke Yiddish.

At the beginning of the 20th century, over six million Jews lived in Eastern Europe. They were organized into large and small communities, living in big cities, such as Warsaw (with a population of about 300,000 Jews), as well as in small towns with populations of only tens or hundreds of Jews.

== Before the 18th century ==
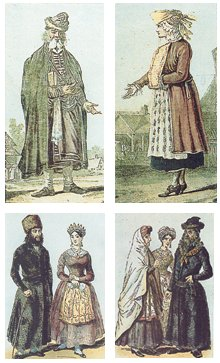
Polish Jews in typical clothing - 17th century (top), 18th century (bottom)

At the beginning of the 16th century, the number of Jews who lived in Eastern Europe was estimated to be between 10,000 and 30,000. In parts of Eastern Europe, before the arrival of the Ashkenazi Jews from Central Europe, some non-Ashkenazi Jews were present who spoke Leshon Knaan and held various other non-Ashkenazi traditions and customs.

As early as the beginning of the 17th century, it was known that there were Jews living in cities of Lithuania who spoke "Russiany" (from Hebrew: רוסיתא) and did not know the "Ashkenaz tongue", i.e. German-Yiddish.

In 1966, historian Cecil Roth questioned the inclusion of all Yiddish-speaking Jews as Ashkenazim in descent, suggesting that upon the arrival of Ashkenazi Jews from Central Europe to Eastern Europe, from the Middle Ages to the 16th century, there were already a substantial number of Jews there who later abandoned their original culture in favor of Ashkenazi culture.

However, according to more recent research, mass migrations of Yiddish-speaking Ashkenazi Jews occurred to Eastern Europe from the west who increased due to high birth rates and absorbed and/or largely replaced the preceding non-Ashkenazi Jewish groups of Eastern Europe (the latter groups' numbers are estimated by demographer Sergio DellaPergola to have been small).

In the mid-18th century, the number of Jews increased to about 750,000. During this period only one-third of East European Jews lived in areas with a predominantly Polish population. The rest of the Jews lived among other peoples, mainly in the Ukrainian and Russian-Lithuanian environments.

The numerical increase was due to mass migration of Yiddish-speaking Ashkenazi Jews from Central Europe to Eastern Europe beginning from the Middle Ages to the 16th century, as well as a high birth rate among these immigrants.

Genetic evidence also indicates that Yiddish-speaking Eastern European Jews largely descended from Ashkenazi Jews who migrated from central Europe and subsequently experienced high birthrates and genetic isolation.

In the mid-18th century, two-thirds of the Jewish population of Eastern Europe lived in cities or towns, and a third of it lived in villages - a unique phenomenon that hardly existed in Western Europe. In every village where Jews lived, there were only two Jewish families on average, and each family usually consisted of no more than ten Jews.

In most of the urban localities in which they lived, the Jewish population comprised half the number of residents on average. It follows that in many towns, there was a Jewish majority.

This reality has been intensified over the years, with the percentage of Jews in cities and towns increasing, and thus the "shtetl" phenomenon was created - the "Jewish town", a large part of which was Jewish, and whose Jewish cultural character was prominent.

=== Economics and commerce ===
Jews engaged in trade and various crafts, such as tailoring, weaving, leather processing, and even agriculture. The economic activity of Eastern European Jewry was different from that of Central and Western European Jews as they specialized in trade, leasing, and crafts, which were hardly found in Western Europe. Moreover, Eastern European Jews were often involved in economic matters that Jews in Central and Western Europe did not deal with at all.

Until the mid-17th century with the 1648 Cossack riots on Jewish population, eastern European Jews lived in a relatively comfortable environment that enabled them to thrive. The Jews, for the most part, enjoyed extensive economic, personal and religious freedom.

Thus, for example, deportations, foreclosure of Jewish property, and the removal of financial debts of non-Jews to Jews, which were common in Western Europe, hardly existed in the East.

Despite the privileges, there was also hatred towards Jews. In words of Jewish sage Shlomo Maimon:

"It is possible that there is no country other than Poland, where freedom of religion and hatred of religion are found in equal measure. The Jews are allowed to preserve their religion with absolute freedom, and the rest of the civil rights have been assigned to them, and they have even their own courts. And in opposite to that, you find that religion hatred is so great there to the extent of that matter, the word 'Jew' is an abomination."

=== Traditional life ===
The amount of Torah study among Eastern European Jews at the beginning of their settlement was little. As a result, many halakhic questions and problems were addressed to rabbis and Torah scholars in Germany and Bohemia which were closer to them.

From the 16th century, luxurious study centers were established in Eastern Europe, where the Hassidic movement also began to develop.

=== Social structure ===
The Jewish social structure in Eastern Europe was built of communities and from the mid-16th century to 1764, central institutions, including communal ones, of self-leadership in Eastern Europe were running. The two main institutions were the Four-State Committee and the Lithuanian State Council. The committees' role was to collect taxes from the Jewish communities and deliver them to the authorities.

Later they took it upon themselves to represent the Jewish community to the foreign rulers of those countries. In addition, the committee had judicial authority over internal laws and Halachot within the Jewish communities.

The Council of Four Lands was the highest institution among the committees. The committee was composed out of seven rabbinic judges when the head of them was always a representative of the Lublin community. The other members of the committee were representatives of the cities of Poznan, Krakow and Lvov.

Historical documents bearing the Committee's signature indicate that in certain periods the committee was expanded to represent all the important communities in the kingdom, and then the number of representatives was close to thirty.

At first, the committee met in Lublin, giving the city the status of a top-notch Jewish center. The conference, which lasted about two weeks, was held once a year during the winter, when the city's largest trade fair was coordinated. In a later period, the conference was held twice a year: a winter gathering in Lublin and a summer conference in the city of Yaroslav in Galicia.

== From the late 18th century to the beginning of the 20th century ==
In the late 18th century, the Jews of Eastern Europe were divided into two major geographic regions: a settlement controlled by the Russian Empire, and a Galicia under the control of the Austria-Hungarian Empire.

=== The settlement ===
The three divisions of Poland (first in 1772, then in 1793, and finally in 1795) left the most part of the Polish Jewry under the authority of the Russian Empire. The Russian government turned out to be less tolerant towards Jews, and more restrictions were imposed on Jews than the rest of the Polish people.

In 1791, Czarina Catherine the Great limited Jews to only live in regions of the western fringes of the empire, known as the Pale of Settlement (the 'Moshav').

The Moshav included most of the former territories of Poland and Lithuania, which were populated by concentrations of Jews. Limiting those boundaries led to the uprooting and deportation of Moscow and St. Petersburg Jews to the eastern border of the country, which was one of the main goals of the authorities. Later, the Jews of Kiev were also forbidden to live in their own city, even though Kiev itself was included in the "region of the Settlement."

At the beginning of the 20th century, more than five million Jews lived in Czarist Russia, with 90% of them concentrated in the region of the Settlement and about three million Jews lived in the former borders of Poland. According to various estimates, Eastern European Jewry constituted 80% of the world Jewry at the beginning of the 20th century.

=== Galicia ===
Another large Jewish community in Eastern Europe was Galicia, the territory that was given to Austria in the partition of Poland. Towards the end of the 19th century, Emperor Franz Joseph intended to "acculturate" the Jews by establishing a network of schools for general studies. Some Jews supported this goal, but most of them opposed it. Further resistance arose when an attempt was made to settle the Jews on the land.

The Jews in Galicia were known for their religious piety, and they fought hard against the Enlightenment and against attempts to "assimilate" them culturally. There was also a sharp confrontation between supporters of Hasidism and those opposed to it (Misnagdim). Eventually Hasidism won and became the dominant movement among the Jews of Galicia.

In 1867, the Jews of Galicia were granted full equality of rights, and thus were the first among the Jews of Eastern Europe to be emancipated. The Zionist movement flourished in Galicia.

During the 19th century and the beginning of the 20th century, before World War I, the Jewish community flourished in Galicia. A large number of books and poems were published there, many Torah sages were engaged in it and Zionism and Yiddish culture also emerged.

At the beginning of the 20th century, the number of Jews in Galicia reached more than 800,000.

== Antisemitism ==
In Switzerland, antisemitism in the years between World War I and World War II was mostly directed towards the so-called Ostjuden, who were perceived to have a foreign fashion and culture. In fact, Ostjuden were explicitly mentioned by Heinrich Rothmund, head of the Swiss federal Alien Police:

...we are not such horrible monsters after all. But we do not let anyone walk all over us, especially Eastern Jews, who, as it is well known, try and try again to do just that, because they think a straight line is crooked; here our position is probably in complete agreement with our Swiss people."

As antisemitism in Germany escalated after the World War I, German Jews were divided in regard to how they felt about the Yiddish-speaking Eastern European Jews. Some German Jews, who were wrestling with the notion of their own German identity, became more accepting of a shared identity with Eastern Jewry.

Austrian novelist Joseph Roth depicted the misfortunes of Eastern European Jewry in the aftermath of World War I in his novel The Wandering Jews. After the Nuremberg Laws were passed in 1935, he said that the archetype of the "Wandering Jew" now extended to the identity of German Jews, whom he described as being "more homeless than even their cousin in Łódź".

== See also ==
- Ashkenazi Jews
- History of the Jews in Poland
- History of the Jews in Russia
- History of the Jews in Ukraine
- Council of Four Lands
- Shtetl
- Pale of Settlement

== Sources ==
- Jared Diamond (1993). "Who are the Jews?" (PDF). Archived from the original (PDF) on 2011-07-21.
- Hammer, MF; Redd, AJ; Wood, ET; et al. (June 2000). "Jewish and Middle Eastern non-Jewish populations share a common pool of Y-chromosome biallelic haplotypes". Proceedings of the National Academy of Sciences. 97 (12): 6769–6774. doi:10.1073/pnas.100115997. PMC 18733. PMID 10801975.
- Wade, Nicholas (9 May 2000). "Y Chromosome Bears Witness to Story of the Jewish Diaspora". The New York Times.
- "Germany: Virtual Jewish History Tour". Jewishvirtuallibrary.org.
- Microsoft Encarta Online Encyclopaedia 2007. Europe. Archived from the original on 28 October 2009.
