= Germany Foundation =

German organisation that existed from 1966 to 2007

The Germany Foundation (German: Deutschland-Stiftung) was a national conservative German organisation associated with the Christian Democratic Union and Christian Social Union, that existed from 1966 to 2007. It was founded in Rosenheim in Bavaria and incorporated in 1967. The organisation was founded by author Kurt Ziesel after a visit to Konrad Adenauer, who became its first honorary president. From 1967 to 2001 the foundation awarded the Konrad Adenauer Prize and published the magazine Deutschland-Magazin. The foundation was viewed as an organisation of the conservative faction within CDU/CSU, and was staunchly anti-communist.

The foundation dissolved because of a lack of funds.

Related persons include:

- Konrad Adenauer; honorary president
- Alfons Goppel; member of the honorary board
- Heinrich Hellwege; member of the honorary board
- Hans-Joachim von Merkatz; member of the honorary board
- Hans-Joachim Schoeps; member of the advisory board
- Gerhard Löwenthal; president from 1977 to 1994
- Georg Stadtmüller; president from 1966 to 1968
