= The Wandering Jews =

Book by Joseph Roth

The Wandering Jews (German: Juden auf Wanderschaft) is a short non-fiction book (1926–27) by Joseph Roth about the plight of the Jews in the mid-1920s, who had fled to the West from Lithuania, Poland, and Russia, with other refugees and displaced persons in the aftermath of World War I, the Russian Revolution, and the redrawing of national frontiers following the Treaty of Versailles.

In the last five months of 1926, Roth visited the Soviet Union, where he wrote the final section, The Condition of the Jews in Soviet Russia.

Walter Jens called it the best book on its subject in German.

An English translation by Michael Hofmann was published in 2001.

== Attitudes ==
Joseph Roth wrote the book for "readers with respect for pain, for human greatness, and for the squalor that everywhere accompanies misery; Western Europeans who are not merely proud of their clean mattresses." The book displays his "lifelong sympathies with simple people, the dispossessed guests on this earth and his antipathy to a selfish, materialistic, and increasingly homogeneous bourgeoisie."

Roth is warm to his subjects, with "the exception of the middle-class, assimilated, denying Jews in the West." Jews in Germany and France, believing themselves to be assimilated, tended to look down on the newcomers to the West.

He sensed that the countries of Europe, stumbling out of one war and into another, floored by inflation, willing victims of atrocious right-wing propaganda and nationalist rhetoric, would not be hospitable to the Jews being turned out of the East.

Born in Galicia, an Eastern European province of the Habsburg Empire, he witnessed the end of the empire, yet continued to call it his only homeland. He regarded it as "something that contained multitudes, something not exclusive".

According to his English translator Michael Hoffman, Jews represented "human beings in their least packaged form"; "the most anomalous, individual of peoples", fissured by history and geography.

Roth believed in Judaism in the sense of a somewhat separate presence of Jews within and throughout Europe. He believed communism would erase both antisemitism and Jewish identity. He never went to Palestine, but objected to the creation of a nation-state there for Jews.
