= Max Naumann =

German Jewish politician (1875–1939)

- Born: 12 January 1875; Berlin
- Died: 18 May 1939 (aged 64); Berlin
- Movement: League of National German Jews

Max Naumann (12 January 1875 – 18 May 1939) was the founder of the League of National German Jews, which called for the elimination of Jewish ethnic identity through Jewish assimilation. The league was outlawed by the Nazi government on 18 November 1935.

Naumann was a captain in the Bavarian Army during World War I and a Berlin lawyer.

== Personal life ==
Naumann was born to an assimilated Eastern European Jewish family. He attended the Friedrichs-Werdersches Gymnasium in Berlin, and received a law degree from the University of Berlin. While in university, he joined a fraternity.

He married and eventually divorced. He had a daughter, and she strongly disapproved of his support for the Nazi party.

== Military service ==
He served as an infantry commander during World War I. He first served in the Prussian military, but was denied an officer's title because of his Jewish heritage. He then enlisted in the 2nd Bavarian Infantry Regiment, where he eventually became a captain. He was awarded the Iron Cross (First and Second Class).

== Political action ==
Standing in opposition to Jewish organizations, such as the Centralverein deutscher Staatsbürger jüdischen Glaubens (Central Association of German Citizens of Jewish Faith), and Zionist groups, Naumann advocated total assimilation as an answer to antisemitism. During the Weimar Republic Naumann was active with the German People's Party. In 1931, Naumann advocated that patriotic German Jews should support the Nazi party even if it is anti-Semitic. He was quoted in Michael Brenner's book The Renaissance of Jewish Culture in Weimar Germany as saying "The election campaign must not be a struggle of religious conceptions, it must be a decisive struggle about our Germanness!" in reference to the 1933 election that followed Hitler's rise to power.

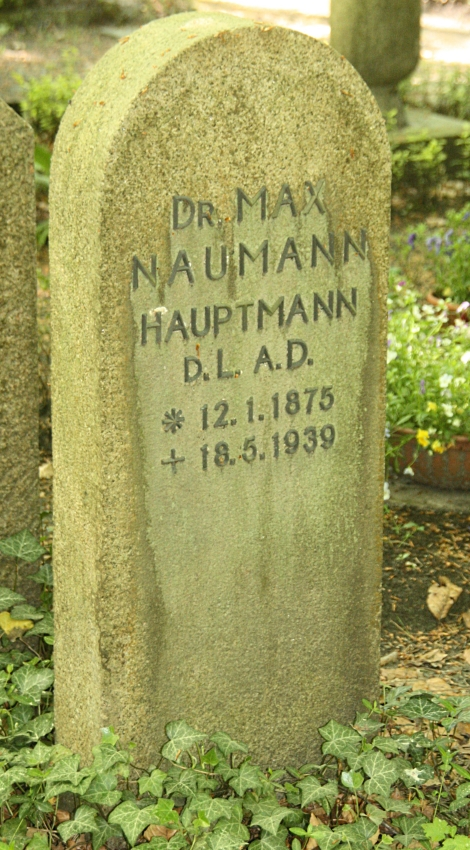
Max Naumann's Grave in Stahnsdorf Cemetery

Along with Julius Brodnitz, Heinrich Stahl, Kurt Blumenfeld and Martin Michael Rosenblüth, Naumann was one of the Jewish activists who were summoned to a meeting with Hermann Göring on 25 March 1933. Göring tried to enlist their help in preventing a rally against Nazi antisemitism which was planned in New York City for 27 March (see Mass meetings of the Anti-Nazi boycott of 1933). Göring claimed that Jews in Germany were spreading lies about Jews being attacked by Nazi forces. Naumann responded to Göring by producing a list of abuses, even producing a newspaper clipping showing Nazis forcing Jews to scrub streets with brushes. Naumann was among the Jewish leaders who said there was nothing that they could do to stop the protest in foreign countries.

Naumann individually or on behalf of the League accused Eastern European Jews of being war profiteers in Germany after World War I, and advocated confiscating their assets. In 1934, Naumann telegraphed Hitler his condemnation of statements made by the World Jewish Congress that were both critical of the Nazi government and called for a stronger boycott against Germany, calling them "outrooted Zionists".

As late as 1935, Naumann sent a congratulatory birthday greeting to Hitler, which was denounced by most German Jews. He dismissed his critics as Zionists. Naumann publicly sought the right to fly the Nazi flag, which Jews were not allowed to do.

Naumann's group was dissolved by the Gestapo in 1935. Naumann was incarcerated at Columbia Haus, where after a couple of weeks he attempted to commit suicide by slitting his wrists using the glass from his eyeglasses. He was then released. He died of cancer on 18 May 1939. He was buried in a Protestant cemetery in Stahnsdorf, Germany.
