= Strong black woman =

Ethnic archetype

The strong black woman schema, as defined by scholars, is an archetype of how the ideal Black woman is expected to act, which has been characterized by three components: emotional restraint, independence, and caretaking. Strong black women are expected to display strength and independence by holding back their emotions and taking responsibility for other people's problems. The schema originated from stereotypes of enslaved Black women and grew from the intersectional oppression that Black women face from societal expectations.

Some examples of idealized strong black women in today's society include Michelle Obama, Oprah, Beyoncé, and Serena Williams. Although these women's attributes are regarded as the standard for how strong black women can achieve great success in society, they are outliers. Not all Black women are offered the same opportunities, but they are still held to the same standard of near-indestructibility, which is why the strong black woman is considered a schema, as it is malleable and continuously changes alongside societal expectations of womanhood and strength.

== History ==
The stereotypes known as the Jezebel, Mammy, and the Sapphire originate from society's early impressions of enslaved Black women. Kimberly Wallace Sanders wrote a note titled Mammy: A Century of Race, Gender, and Southern Memory in which she describes the Mammy as "the ultimate symbol of maternal devotion" and recognizes how this image helped define "the nature of slavery, gender relations, motherhood, and memory in the American South." As a female slave, the Mammy was responsible for household activity and often taking care of white children and slave children, and could be seen as the first example of the strong black woman schema due to her endless responsibilities and expectation to provide and care without complaint.

This stereotype outlived slavery and can be seen across popular media forms such as in the movie Gone with the Wind, in which Hattie McDaniel portrays a Mammy in a nostalgic old South plantation home; and DW Griffith's 1915 film The Birth of a Nation, in which the Mammy figure defends her masters' plantation during the Civil War. Mammy figures were portrayed in the media as happy house slaves that enjoyed serving their masters. This false narrative was used to legitimize slavery and white supremacy.

Black feminist writers such as Joan Morgan have spoken up about the misinformation surrounding the strong black woman schema and how it holds Black women to an unrealistic and unachievable standard. In her book When Chickenheads Come Home To Roost, Morgan discusses her experiences as a Black woman and her relationship with hip-hop feminism. In the chapter titled "strong black women", she discusses her choice to retire from being a strong black woman. She states that "Retirement was ultimately an act of salvation. Being an SBW was killing me slowly. Cutting off my air supply." She continues to write about how her life became consumed with solving other people's problems and left no time to take care of herself.

== Research and health effects ==
Black women are expected to seemingly overcome any obstacle without weakness, but the appearance of strength can manifest deeper issues within, which have been studied and show many links between the strong black woman schema and mental and physical health problems.

The article "The Strong Black Woman: Insights and Implications for Nursing" compiles evidence from several studies to discuss the overall impact that the strong black woman schema has on the health of Black women, and specifically, the racism present within healthcare education and practice. The article "The danger of the 'strong Black woman' trope for mental health" features evidence collected by the National Institutes of Health highlighting the notion that depression is comparatively more prevalent in women than in men. The internalization of inaccurate stereotypes like the strong black woman schema has damaging effects such as higher levels of stress, anxiety, depression, and even greater instances of suicide and substance abuse. Attempting to get help professionally—or even from a friend—is frowned upon, as that would appear to be the opposite of strength. Black women often work in jobs with less flexibility, again forcing them to choose work over their well-being.

Staton et al. (2007) found that doctors were more inclined to underestimate feelings of pain in Black patients compared to their other patients. These disparities may be explained by unconscious biases held by medical professionals that stem from harmful stereotypes such as the SBW schema. As Black women are assumed to feel less pain than white mothers, they are put at greater risk during childbirth.

In 2009, Earlise C. Ward and Susan M. Heidrich examined Black women's representations and beliefs about mental illness (i.e. depression and anxiety), if they felt any stigma associated with seeking treatment for said mental illnesses, and if these perceptions differed by age group.

Ashley (2014) presents a case study of a Black woman with PTSD and argues that incorporating racial and cultural awareness in psychological treatment plans help address the unique struggles that people like her face. Instead of setting standardized goals which are traditionally Eurocentric in nature, Ashley found that "culturally competent" approaches work exponentially better for Black patients, yet many are neglected of this need.

The journal article by Sandra P. Thomas argues that Black Americans were disproportionately negatively affected by the COVID-19 pandemic and that the racial injustices of 2020 caused a massive mental health crisis in the Black community, but that this crisis cannot be adequately addressed until psychiatric professionals learn the psychological effects of racism and address their own racism. Thomas argues and cites that Black patients are more likely to be considered psychotic by practitioners than depressed and that Black women receive less screening, treatment initiation, and guideline-abiding care for depression.

In January 2022, LaTonya M. Summers and Pam S. Lassiter argued that the Black community is one of the most evident minority groups in the U.S. yet their psychological issues are among the least-effectively-treated. By consulting Black counselors, they suggested strategies that would better inform other professionals on how to effectively address Black mental health issues, an example being the Black community's need for "culturally-sensitive trauma, grief, and loss work", whereby knowledge of transgenerational grief and trauma is incorporated to make treatments more effective.

In June 2022, Stephanie Castelin and Grace White argued that the strong black woman schema also negatively affects the mental health of Black women. Through interviewing 212 college-age Black women, collecting data on numeral scales of their amount of psychological suffering, resilience, suicidal behavior, and their adherence to the schema, they found a positive correlation between the upholding of the schema and psychological suffering (r = .56, with the p-value being less than .001).

== 21st-century identity ==
Patricia Hill Collins explores the control of popular culture on confining Black womanhood to negative stereotypes. She writes that "[the] dominant ideology of the slave era fostered the creation of several interrelated, socially constructed controlling images of Black womanhood, each reflecting the dominant group's interest in maintaining Black women's subordination". Beauboeuf-Lafontant (2007) discusses the concept of "controlling images" further. The peer-reviewed article "Race and Reactions to Women's Expressions of Anger at Work: Examining the Effects of the "Angry Black Woman" Stereotype" explains how black women are stereotyped in the workplace and how it lowers their chances to move forward in the profession. Most believe that black women are the opposite of white women. White women are seen as being polite, family-oriented, and ladylike. When something in the workplace arises, the most asked questions are "What's their gender?" and "What's their race?". These questions already show discriminatory behavior in the workplace and society. They did a few studies of different scenarios of black women in the workplace. They conclude that the studies have evidence of mistreatment in the workplace.

== Black women in music ==
Black women's musical influence is a prominent factor in the deconstruction of controlled images that portray black women with negative stereotypes. Some black women have become a caricature of the stereotypical hypersexual women while others have diverted away from those stereotypes to promote the idealized image of a conservative black woman. Hip-hop has been a method Black women use to reveal their strength against the "countless amounts of oppression they've faced both within and outside the Black community." Black male rappers regard women in derogatory ways with terms such as "bitches" and "hoes". To combat those words, Black female rappers have formed categories that portray different personality traits in rap music: "Queen Mother", Fly Girl", "Sista with Attitude" and "Lesbian".

Black female rappers have adopted the "scammer" persona in their musical lyricism and video images. An unsympathetic, materialistic, and financially driven woman embodies the "scammer" archetype. The artists City Girls and Cardi B are known to apply this concept in their work as evident in the lyrics: "Bad bitch, cute face, yeah you like that/Don't be surprised if I ask where the bag at." – City Girls ("Where the Bag at") and "All a bad bitch need is the money." – Cardi B ("Money") Each representative of Black women rappers has subverted the stereotype of the "angry black women".

Racist and sexist stereotypes in America that characterized African Americans as hypersexual and animalistic created a lot of discourse around Black women's sexuality. The hip-hop culture, in its androcentric nature, tends to sexually exploit Black women, who have been historically classified as subordinate to White women. The politics of articulation developed as a tool of empowerment for women and an opportunity to move away from respectability politics to express sexuality from their perspective and create a subversion of androcentric ideas. The rapper Megan Thee Stallion applies the politics of articulation through her musical persona and sexually-explicit lyrics in her single "Savage", in which she employed the identities placed on women in the hip-hop genre and gave them a new meaning. In the lyrics "I'm that bitch", Meghan changes the word "bitch" from its dehumanizing identity of a female dog to one with the connotation of dominance; an alpha woman. The word "ratchet" has been used to portray black women as "mean", "loud", and "promiscuous". Meghan used the word "ratchet" amongst other identities in the song to "subvert" the ideological connotations of the word. Lyrics: I'm a savage/Classy, bougie, ratchet/Sassy, moody, nasty."

The independent aspect of the strong black woman is illustrated in the lyrics and videos of Black female and male artists. The men's message of the independent women in these songs are sometimes contradictory. The positive narrative of the independent woman is that she is a beautiful, financially secure college graduate who can cook and clean, and is a good supporter. However, in rap songs the independent woman is regarded as a "broad", "bitch", and "chick"; derogatory terms that signal to the woman "she's just a woman beneath him in the social hierarchy." The independent woman is presented as perfect in many songs like "Miss Independent" by Ne-Yo.

Black women add to the independent women narrative with their own music promoting their independency. "If you're gonna brag, make sure it's your money you flaunt/depend on no one else to give you what you want." – Destiny's Child ("Independent Women Part 2")

== Portrayals ==
Examples of media containing the strong black woman character within a show or film include:

- Annalise Keating, from How to Get Away With Murder, played by Viola Davis
- Celie, from The Color Purple, played by Whoopi Goldberg
- Katherine Johnson, from Hidden Figures, played by Taraji P. Henson
- Michonne, from The Walking Dead, played by Danai Gurira
- Olivia Pope, from Scandal, played by Kerry Washington
- Patsey, from 12 Years a Slave, played by Lupita Nyong'o
- Sofia, from The Color Purple, played by Oprah Winfrey
- Jax Steward, from Reasonable Doubt, played by Emayatzy Corinealdi

== See also ==
- Angry white man
- Black Buck
- Black feminism
