= Ratchet feminism =

Response within black feminism to respectability politics

Ratchet feminism emerged in the United States from hip hop culture in the early 2000s, largely as a critique of, and a response to, respectability politics. It is distinct from black feminism, womanism, and hip hop feminism. Ratchet feminism coopts the derogatory term ratchet. Other terms used to describe this concept include ratchet womanism as used by Georgia Tech professor Joycelyn Wilson or ratchet radicalism used by Rutgers professor Brittney Cooper. Ratchet is an identity embraced by many millennials and Gen Z black women and girls. The idea of ratchetness as empowering, or of ratchet feminism, has been articulated by artists and celebrities like Nicki Minaj, City Girls, Amber Rose, and Junglepussy, scholars like Brittney Cooper and Mikki Kendall, and through events like Amber Rose's SlutWalk. Many view ratchet feminism as a form of female empowerment that doesn't adhere to respectability politics.

== History ==
=== Ratchet definition ===
The slang term ratchet first emerged in the hip hop community in Shreveport, Louisiana, in 1999 with the release of the song "Do the Ratchet" by Anthony Mandigo. The term made its way into the mainstream through popular 2000s hip hop songs such as Lil Boosie's 2004 remix of "Do tha Ratchet." The term was often used to describe the lifestyles of black, inner city youth. The term ratchet became a popular term for women who were deemed hood, ghetto, or loud. In 2017, University of Georgia professor Bettina L. Love wrote that the word was "messy, meaning it has no straightforward definition; it is contradictory, fluid, precarious, agentive, and oftentimes intentionally inappropriate."

=== Ratchet feminism ===
Ratchet feminism, ratchet womanism, ratchet radicalism, and even hood feminism began to appear in the scholarship of hip hop feminist scholars in the early 2000s. Ratchet feminism comes out of the black feminist/womanist tradition and is closely related to hip hop feminism and hood feminism. Rutgers professor Brittney Cooper describes it as "a refusal of female vulnerability." In 2020, the Journal of Hip Hop Studies published a special issue titled Twenty-First Century B.I.T.C.H. Frameworks: Hip Hop Feminism Comes of Age. The editors and contributors of the issue theorize ratchet feminism and provide an outline of the scholarly conversations around ratchet feminism. According to Elizabeth Fielder, ratchet feminism (radicalism) is a form of activism that may often be seen as inappropriate or "over the top."

== Derogatory meaning ==
Several scholars have argued that ratchet as an empowering practice for poor women of color reveals a "shadowy" underground feminism in creating an alternative performance space for black women. There is still a negative meaning attached for many black women, as the term mainly targets them. "There's an emotional violence and meanness attached to being ratchet, particularly pertaining to women of color," says Vibe editor Michaela Angela Davis.

== Ratchet feminism in music ==
Originating in the Southern United States, particularly in cities like Atlanta and Houston, the subgenre of ratchet feminist music challenges traditional gender norms and amplifies the voices of female artists. Ratchet feminism differs from Hip Hop feminism in that it specifically looks to subvert notions of respectability while also incorporating aesthetics of black working class culture.

Ratchet feminism has gained popularity within Hip Hop culture especially in the 2010s with artists like Nicki Minaj, City Girls, and Megan thee Stallion. Key components of the subgenre include woman empowerment, sisterhood, sexual autonomy, and financial independence.

In Megan thee Stallion's 2020 hit song "Savage", she boasts about being "Classy, bougie, ratchet".

Scholars have argued that ratchet feminism in music, offers black women and girls a space to be seen and depicted within pop culture. "The presence of black female rappers and the urban, working-class, black hairstyles, clothes, expressions, and subject matter of their rhymes provide young black women with a small culturally reflective public space.” according to Joan Morgan.

Expressions of ratchet feminism also go beyond music. From the flamboyant to the provocative fashion choices of artists, ratchet feminism also acts as a visual manifesto that empowers black women to express themselves unapologetically. The fashion choices of artists like Cardi B and Lizzo, for example, not only make bold statements about individuality but also contribute to reshaping the fashion industry's narrative around inclusivity and self-expression. This form of expression has been characterized as the hoochie mama aesthetic and has its roots in urban black culture.

== Reclamation of the term ==
Although the term ratchet has had a negative connotation for many decades, in recent years the term has been reclaimed and its meaning recast by not only African-American people, but specifically African-American women. It has been used in songs such as "Savage" by Megan Thee Stallion and "Rumors" by Lizzo and Cardi B. The word ratchet has been used by celebrity women of color globally. These artists include Megan Thee Stallion, Lizzo, Cardi B, City Girls, Taraji P. Henson, and Spain's La Zowi. In reference to Tamar Braxton's reality show, Theri A. Pickens says that "ratchet" has also been seen as "a performative strategy that secures a liberatory space for black women."

Ratchet has also used by white celebrities such as Miley Cyrus, who has been called out for acting "ratchet" and accused of appropriating black culture.

== Conversations on the term ==
As of 2021, the term ratchet had many different definitions, and there was ongoing debate on what is considered ratchet. For some people, the word symbolizes empowerment among women. Rapper and TV personality Cardi B is often cited as an example of a celebrity criticized for being too "ratchet" but who chose to embrace the term.

The term was also discussed during an episode of the PBS web series A Seat at the Table titled "Bougie, Ghetto and Ratchet? Stereotypes of Black Women." At the University of Texas, Austin, Christen Smith from the Department of African and African Diaspora Studies created the blog "Redefining Ratchet" with students to encourage conversation on the term. One goal of the project was "to redefine the meaning, implication, and power of the term 'ratchet'".

Several scholars have also engaged in conversations around the performance of ratchet by black women in reality TV. Some scholars have also connected the image of the ratchet black woman to the sapphire or angry black woman trope discussed by scholars like Melissa Harris-Perry and Patricia Hill Collins.

== See also ==
- Misogynoir
