= Black women =

Women who are of sub-Saharan African descent

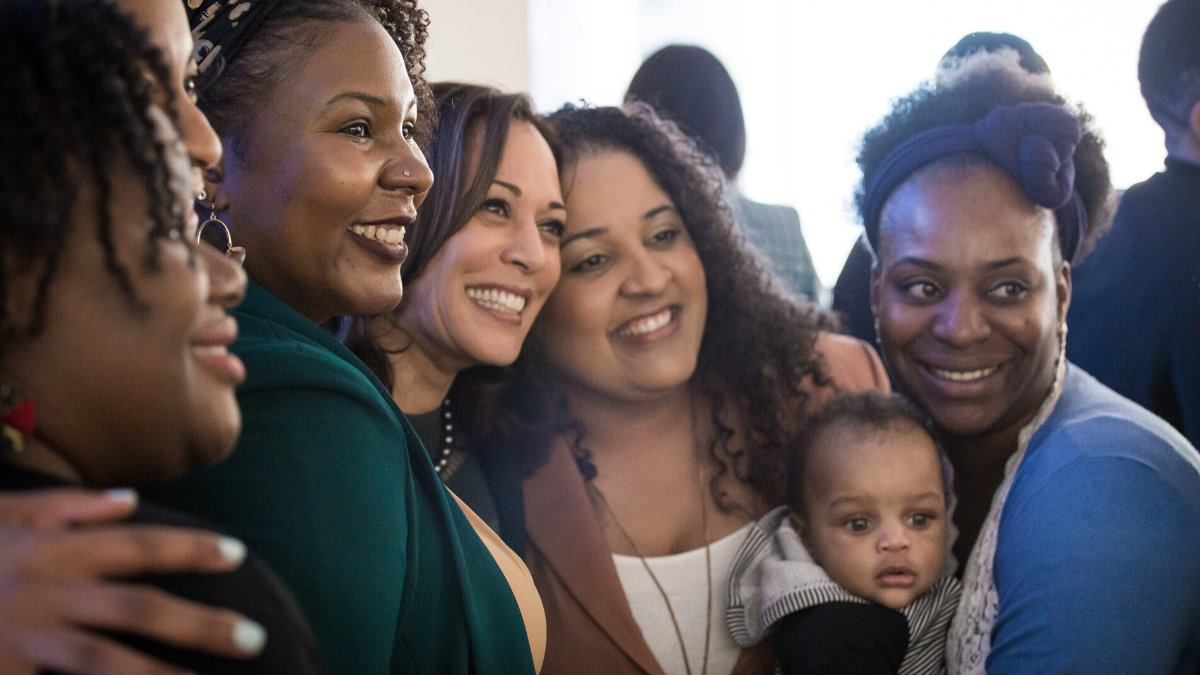
American politician Kamala Harris meeting African American women (2020)

Black women generally refers to women of sub-Saharan African descent.

== Intersectionality and misogynoir ==
Kimberlé Williams Crenshaw developed the theory of intersectionality, which highlighted the overlapping discrimination faced by Black women (on the basis of both race and gender) in the United States. The theory has been influential in the fields of feminism and critical race theory as a methodology for interpreting the ways in which overlapping social identities relate to systems of oppression. More recently, the term misogynoir has been created to describe the specific effect of intersectionality on Black women. Misogynoir is the term that is used to describe the overlapping cases of misogyny and racism. Examples of misogynoir experienced by Black women include the stereotype of the angry Black woman or Jezebel (stereotype that Black women are more sexually promiscuous) and vulnerability to sex trafficking among others. These more specific terms were created as Black women have been historically left out of movements for both racial justice and feminist equality.

Womanism is a social theory based on the history and experiences of Black women. Coined by Alice Walker, the concept now encompasses a spectrum of various fields, such as Africana womanism and womanist theology.

== Around the world ==
=== Africa ===
The 2003 Maputo Protocol on women's rights in Africa set the continental standard for progressive expansion of women's rights. It guarantees comprehensive rights to women, including the right to participate in the political process, social and political equality with men, autonomy in their reproductive health decisions, and an end to female genital mutilation (FGM).

==== Ghana ====
Woman and child in Tamale, Ghana (2014)

Women in Ghana typically experience poverty at higher rates than their male counterparts as a result of less educational opportunities, elevated unemployment rates, and gender inequality. Historically, Ghanaian culture has created the role of women to be in the home cooking, cleaning, and taking care of children. Ghanaian women usually complete only primary school as a result of these societal expectations. Men are primarily regarded as breadwinners and have more economic mobility as a result of their ability to carry on the family name and amass ownership of land, one of the highest forms of capital.

Within theoretical approaches identifying as “Black” or “Afrocentric”, or employing anticolonialist concepts like the “internalization” of “colonial mentality”, scholars forcefully claim and highlight that the patriarchal societal conditions originated particularly from European colonization of Ghana from the 15th century up until the 20th century, but pay much less attention to the intricate effects one would assume also having been played by forces such as the endogenous, distinct and particular, interacting and co-dependent, adaptive and/or mediating cultural and societal features pre- and co-existing in Ghana alongside colonization and its ills. It is possible that this reflects the rigidity as well as the dogmatic and activist commitments inherent to the largely anticolonialist origins of the theory underlying such research. According to the analyses in the vein of said kind of scholarship, the structural colonialist frameworks set up during those five centuries are particularly seen to have favored Eurocentric beauty standards, work ethic, and culture, fracturing the Ghanaian identity and customs, and seen as explaining such harmful practices as providing space for only men to further their education, secure a well-paying job, and be politically active. Some other examples mentioned include only teaching women how to be suitable for men, and promoting skin bleaching among women to become closer to whiteness. After Ghana gained their independence in 1957 from Britain, women were not compensated for their inability to own land and gain foundational skills under colonial frameworks, seen as instrumental in creating the cycle of poverty.

The patriarchality of Ghana's society, regardless of the extent to which it is ultimately the result of colonialism, has been impacting women not only economically but relationally as well. Abuse is a prevalent component of polygamous and monogamous relationships in Ghana. It can be hard for women to get out of being a sex worker because it might be viewed as the only way to provide for their families or themselves. The criminalization of sex work in Ghana also makes it difficult for women to escape abuse from their pimps and customers and seek help.

Another factor that plays a role in the susceptibility of women being in poverty is the rise in female-headed households as a result of divorce, women becoming widows, or women being separated from their partners. This has exacerbated the issue of poverty among women because they're unable to have access to the benefits of the socio-economic status men hold in Ghana.

Economically, the majority of Ghanaian women work within the informal sector of Ghana's economy, meaning they are mostly self-employed. Self-employment does not always guarantee a stable source of income, making it hard for women to make enough money to support themselves and their families. Some of the prominent entrepreneurial jobs women take up in Ghana are hairdressing, dressmaking, market trading, and agriculture. Market trading, especially, has been a good way for women to better their chances of getting out of poverty because they are given the opportunity to take part in credit services, acquire insurance on their personal items, and build their savings. According to Wrigley-Asante in her journal article, “market women are considered the backbone of food distribution, ensuring food security for the urban economy.” Ghanaian women are very important contributors to Ghana's economy despite not having access to steady wages.

Ghana's government has made strides to address the inequalities present within the culture by creating the WID (Women in Development) initiative in the 1970s to cater to women's welfare, SAPs (structural adjustment programs) in the 1980s to help women enhance their productivity, and PAMSCAD (Program of Action to Mitigate the Social Costs of Adjustment) in the late 1980s and early 1990s to help boost the socioeconomic status of Ghanaian women. These initiatives and programs ultimately failed because they were not addressing the root cause of poverty among women, and colonialism's lasting impacts have arguably rendered the Ghanaian government ill-prepared to give the necessary resources to such complex programs.

Women play a modest role in Ghana's two major political parties, the National Democratic Congress (NDC) and New Patriotic Party (NP), as well as in the Convention People's Party (CPP). The first president, Kwame Nkrumah (CPP), made Ghana the first African nation to introduce a quota in 1959, reserving 10 seats for women in Parliament. Ghana has recently been laggard, however, with a representation of 11% women after the election in 2012 and 13% after the election in 2016.

==== Tunisia ====
In Tunisia, Black women are victims of double discrimination, facing prejudice both because of their gender and race. Testimonial evidences complied by the Tunis-branch of Rosa Luxemburg Foundation presented cases of Black women being "stigmatised, hyper-sexualised, and objectified" It has been noted that this sexualization of Black Tunisian women leads to them being viewed as objects by Arab men to "achieve sexual satisfaction" and face sexual harassment.

The feminist movement in the Arab world—including Tunisia—has been labelled as racist, failing to take into consideration the issues of women who are not Arab; this has led to parallels between Arab feminism and White feminism. In 2020, four Black Tunisian women created the Facebook group Voices of Tunisian Black Women in an attempt to bring to light these issues affecting them, which they felt were not being discussed in the Me Too movement. Khawla Ksiksi, one of the group's founders, has stated that comments made by President Kais Saied in 2023 regarding Sub-Saharan migrants has worsened living conditions for Black Tunisians, with many Black Tunisian women participating in the "Carrying My Papers Just In Case" trend.

=== Caribbean ===
Jennifer Palmer argues that in the plantation world of the colonial Caribbean, women of color were typically treated as property owned by White men. In the French islands, race and gender shape popular assumptions about who could own property. However, there were legal loopholes that sometimes opened up windows of opportunity for women of color to be landowners.

=== United States ===
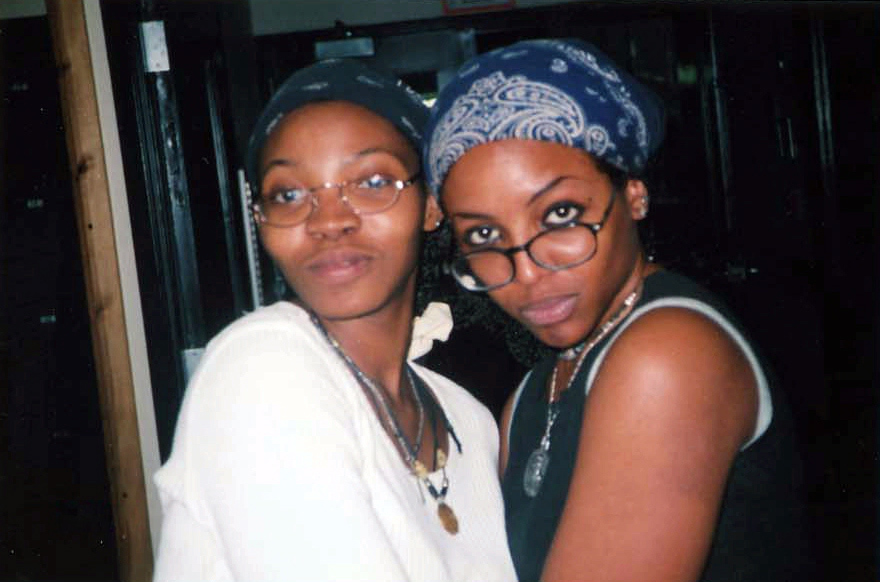
Two African American women

According to the 2023 American Community Survey from the U.S. Census Bureau, the Black female population in the United States was approximately 21.1 million.

The history of African American women in early America can be divided into three main periods: from settlement to the formal establishment of slavery (1607–1660s), the late seventeenth century through the American Revolution (1670–1780), and from the constitutional era to the early antebellum period (1780–1830). Initially, Black women brought into British North America as captives were subjected to the same legal restrictions and social roles as European women. When the first large group of Africans arrived in Jamestown, Virginia in the year 1619, English settlers had no laws supporting lifelong slavery. As a result, African captives were bound by traditional English indenture contracts lasting five to nine years for adults or until minors reached adulthood. Although race was evident, it was not yet a legal factor. African women performed labor similar to that of European or Native women under indenture, with work divided by gender rather than race. The first legal change came in 1643 when the Virginia legislature passed a law taxing all tithable persons, explicitly including “all youths of sixteen years of age upwards, as also for negro women at the age of sixteen years,” distinguishing between white and Black women. A crucial legal development was the shift from indentured servitude to lifelong servitude. While the status of Africans before 1660 is uncertain, a 1661 court case shows that some Africans were already held in permanent bondage. By the end of the seventeenth century, lifelong servitude had become standard for most people of African descent. Virginia colonists altered English common law, which did not mention slavery, to create a local system recognizing the unique status of African men and women. In the 1660s, Virginia passed several laws further restricting the rights of African and African American women. Notably, a 1662 law declared that a child's status—free or enslaved—would follow that of the mother, ensuring slavery was inherited through the maternal line. By the early eighteenth century, institutionalized slavery and legal codes enforcing racial discrimination fully shaped the lives of Black women. Although Virginia led in enacting these laws, other British North American colonies soon adopted similar statutes establishing chattel slavery as inheritable through the mother and denying African American women legal recognition as human beings.

==== American slavery ====
Black slaves, many of whom were women, often faced severe abuse from their owners and other non-black people. Black female slaves were sexually abused by their white male owners and were bred with them in order to bear mulatto children in an attempt to maintain White supremacy, have more slaves to pick cotton and produce superior slaves in the South. Black female slaves received the same treatment in Brazil, Central America, Mexico, Peru and the Caribbean. An example of this is former president and slave owner Thomas Jefferson who fathered mixed-race children with Sally Hemings, a slave that he owned. Black slave women and their bodies were also fetishized by their white male slave owners. During slavery, African American women were often treated as breeders, workers and satisfiers of the white man's lusts. Black women were considered white people's property. Sexual exploitation also shaped their lives during and after slavery. White men following emancipation still would often rape black women to ensure white supremacy. African American women's bodies were also often regulated through a series of ideological mechanisms and were ideologically constructed as the antithesis of white women.

Enslaved black women had no legal means to protect and prevent themselves from sexual assault by white men and their white slave owners. In 1855 in Missouri, an enslaved Black woman named Celia was convicted of murder and executed by hanging for killing a white man who had raped and enslaved her. The court had rejected her self-defense claim, stating that enslaved Black women had no right to resist their white enslavers' sexual advances. Black women were also killed and lynched by white people. In May 1870, 15 white men raped a Black woman while other members of the white mob lynched and killed her husband.

==== Entrepreneurship ====
In response to limited access to capital, American black women turned to their community to create banking systems around trust, solidarity, and community. Maggie L. Walker was the founder of the St. Luke Penny Savings Bank in 1903, becoming the first African American woman to charter and serve as president of a bank. The bank was established to address the barrier of limited access to capital and financial discrimination. Walker's bank provided loans, savings accounts, and financial services to Black individuals and businesses. Black communities also established mutual aid societies, which provided financial support and resources to individuals facing economic hardship acting as safety nets. These strategies helped Black women navigate financial exclusion imposed by racial discrimination; fostered resilience, self-sufficiency, and a sense of collective economic power; and created pathways to entrepreneurship by giving access to capital and support networks.

Many Black women turned to specialized skilled trades developed through domestic labor and enslavement. These trades evolved into professions in sewing, hairdressing, midwifery and cooking and represented another path to financial independence. These trades allowed Black women to generate income, exercise control over their labor, and build clientele within their communities. Black businesses are overrepresented in low-capital-intensity sectors like healthcare and social assistance while being underrepresented in high-capital-intensity sectors like real estate and construction. Black business owners are more likely than white business owners to have their business in the healthcare and social assistance industry due to the lower capital requirements to start businesses in this sector.

According to State of Women Owned Business report of 2020, Black women are the fastest growing entrepreneur group in the United States, creating many innovative businesses across the nation. Despite their entrepreneurial achievements, Black women continue to face racism and discriminatory barriers in business buildings.

==== Education ====
According to the National Center for Education Statistics, Black women are among the most educated in the United States of America. According to a 2024 Pew Research Center study, 38% of Black women aged 25–34 had a bachelor’s degree. This compared to 77% of Asian women, 52% of White women, and 31% of Hispanic women. This was much higher than 26% for Black men and 22% for Hispanic men, comparable to 42% for White men, and below 71% for Asian men.

Historically Black colleges and universities have large gender enrollment disparities. At Howard University, approximately 25% of the student body is male, as of 2025.

Historically, slavery, segregation and racial biases have created obstacles for black women to gain access to education. Anti-literacy statues in many states during slavery and the years following abolition restrained access to education, as it was punishable by death. Despite this fact, black women utilized their proximity to their literate white slaveowners through their domestic work.

==== Self-esteem and confidence ====
Black women have higher self-confidence and self-esteem than any group of women, according to a survey by Glamour and L'Oreal Paris, along with Dr. Jean Twenge, Ph.D., a researcher on the effects of race and self-confidence. Racism and discrimination have not created a downturn in how Black women view themselves. Black women also have a more positive outlook on their physical appearances versus white women. This self-esteem and confidence is celebrated in what is known as "Black Girl Magic".

==== Hair ====
Black women's hair, which is of various textures, has deep cultural meanings, ranging from political statements to pride, beauty, and fashion. Despite there being a lack of education in Black American hair and why Black women choose particular hairstyles and products, cosmetologists and educators have paved the way for greater education in this area, for example, bringing awareness to the fact that Black hair does not create its own oil like white hair does which creates a need for Black women's hair to be treated with moisturizers and oils for it to remain healthy.

Because of greater education in Black women's hair, the United States Army lifted a ban on dreadlocks, which were previously banned. The Navy, Air Force, and Army now allow two-strand twists as well as braids at an increased size. The latter change came after a fight against hair discrimination.

==== Increased risk for health problems ====
Black women are often at a higher risk of contracting certain diseases than White women. According to the American Cancer Society, the death rate for all cancers for Black women is 14% higher than that of White women. While the probability of being diagnosed with cancer in Black women is one in three, the chance of dying from cancer is one in five. Cancer is not the only disease that disproportionately affects African-American women. Black women are three times more likely to develop uterine fibroids. Lupus is two-three times more common in women of color, but more specifically, one in every 537 Black women will have lupus. Black women are also at a higher chance of being overweight thus making them open to more obesity-related diseases.

There is also a racial disparity when it comes to pregnancy-related deaths. While there are 12.4 deaths for every 100,000 births for White women, the statistics for Black women is 40.0 deaths for every 100,000 births. In a 2007 US study of five medical complications that are common causes of maternal death and injury, Black women were two to three times more likely to die than White women who had the same condition. The World Health Organization in 2014 estimated that Black expectant and new mothers in the United States die at about the same rate as women in countries such as Mexico and Uzbekistan. A 2018 study found that "The sexual and reproductive health of African-American women has been compromised because of multiple experiences of racism, including discriminatory healthcare practices from slavery through the post-Civil Rights era." Another 2018 study found that darker skin tones were underrepresented in medical textbook imagery and that these omissions "may provide one route through which bias enters medical treatment". Black women are more likely to die from breast cancer. Black women are also more likely to die from diabetes. Black women have higher rates of HIV than white and Hispanic women. Black women have the highest risk for genital herpes.

Black women also have higher rates of chlamydia than white women. Trichomoniasis is more common among African American women. Black women are more likely to die from cervical cancer. Black women are also prone to anemia. Black women are more likely to die from cardiovascular disease. Black women also have higher rates of syphilis and gonorrhea.

Black women are more likely to catch sexually transmitted diseases because they are less likely to use a condom and are also more likely to engage in sex work. Black women are also overrepresented in human trafficking.

Discrimination, racism, and sexism put black women at risk for low-income jobs, multiple role strain, and health problems that are associated with mental illnesses. Black women with depression are more likely to experience sleep disturbances, self-criticism, and irritability.

Of black women, 60% have been molested or sexually abused before age 18 by a black man.

Black women are more likely to get murdered than white women.

Black women have shorter life expectancies.

The suicide rate for Black women in the United States has been increasing.

==== Politics ====
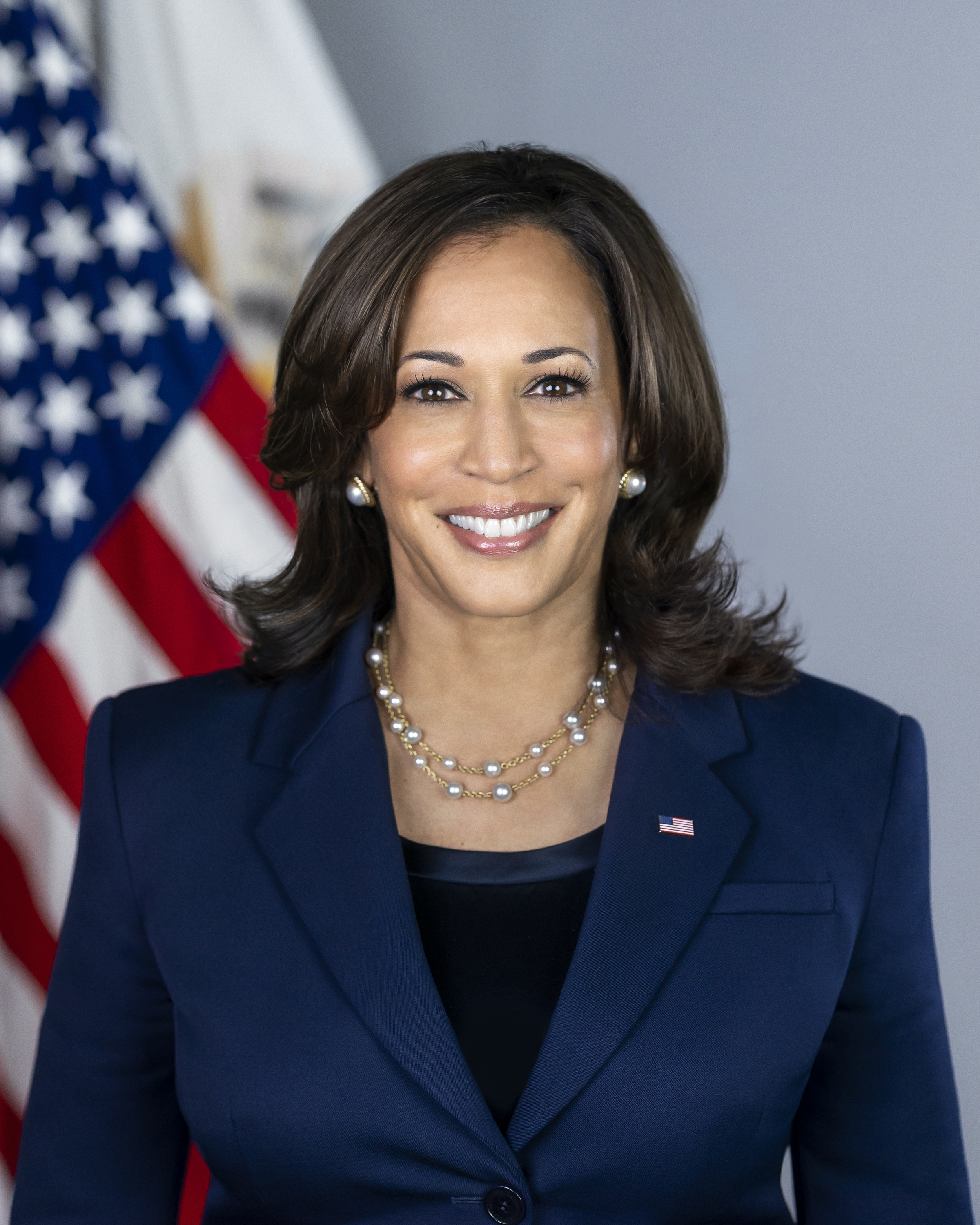
Kamala Harris

Kamala Harris and Shirley Chisholm were the only Black women who ran for president. In 2024, Joe Biden announced on Twitter he would drop out of the race and endorse Harris. She lost to Republican Donald Trump.

Michelle Obama was the first African American first lady.

Black women are more likely to be Democrats.

==== Religion ====
African American women are more likely than Black men to say believing in God is required to become a moral person, believing in Him will determine what will happen in their lives and to say religion is important to them according to Pew Research Center.

=== Brazil ===
Black women make up 28% of the Brazilian population and still suffer discrimination in Brazil. The legacy of slavery and the mistreatment of Black women during the Portuguese colonial era is still dealt with. Interracial marriage between Black women and white Portuguese men was common in Brazil. Black women were often raped by white men in Brazil in an effort to whiten the Brazilian population.

== Famous leaders ==
Some of the most influential artistic and political leaders in history have been Black women. For instance, Queen Qalhata and Candace of Meroe are notable early African queens.

Thus far, 21 Black women have been elected or appointed as head of a UN recognized state, all of which have been in Africa or the Caribbean. The first Black woman to be appointed head of state was Elisabeth Domitien, who served as the Prime Minister of the Central African Republic from January 1975 to April 1976. The longest-serving Black woman head of government was Eugenia Charles, who served as the head of government for Dominica for nearly 15 years, from July 1980 to June 1995. President Ellen Johnson Sirleaf served as President of Liberia for 12 years.

In 2021, Ngozi Okonjo-Iweala became the first Black woman to lead a major multilateral organization when she was appointed Director-General of the World Trade Organization.

Four Black women have been awarded Nobel Prizes. Toni Morrison was the first Black woman to be awarded a Nobel Prize when, in 1993, she was awarded the prize for literature. Wangari Maathai was the first Black woman to win the Nobel Peace Prize which she received in 2004. Ellen Johnson Sirleaf and Leymah Gbowee shared the Nobel Peace Prize with Tawakkol Karman in 2011.

In the United States, Toni Morrison was the first Black woman Nobel laureate. Shirley Chisholm was an important Democratic candidate for U.S. president in the 1970s. In the 2020 United States presidential election, Kamala Harris was named Joe Biden's running mate, making her the first Black and South Asian woman to be on a major party ticket. Biden won the election, making Harris the first Black/South Asian person and Black/South Asian woman to be Vice President of the United States. With Justice Stephen Breyer's announcement of his intention to retire at the end of the 2021–22 term, President Joe Biden nominated Ketanji Brown Jackson to succeed him as Supreme Court justice. She was confirmed by the United States Senate in a 53–47 vote on April 7, 2022, and took her seat on June 30, 2022.

As leaders in the Civil Rights movements over the course of time, Ida B. Wells led an anti-lynching movement in the United States of America and founded the Alpha Suffrage Club and Diane Nash, as chairman of the Nashville Student Movement, continued the Freedom Rides and went on to work on other major 1960s movements. Betsy Stockton paved the way for non-royals in Hawaii to gain access to an education by founding the first non-Royal school in Maui and all of Hawaii in 1823.

== LGBT Black women ==
One survey found that 23% of Black women aged 18 to 34 identify as bisexual in the United States. Black women are increasingly identifying as bisexual. Lesbian marriage is also increasing among Black women. Black trans women often face high levels of discrimination.

== Discrimination ==
Black women often experience both racism and sexism.

Black women also experience colorism. Dark-skinned black women often face more discrimination than light-skinned black women because of colorism. When black women were enslaved in America, the sexual assault of Black women produced light-skinned children, who were afforded more privileges than their darker skinned mothers although they were seldom acknowledged as legitimate children. In the film industry, 80% of Black female characters have light and medium skin tones. Zendaya has admitted she gets more roles than dark skinned black women. In the music industry, Light skinned black women such as Beyoncé and Rihanna have more opportunities and success than dark skinned black female musicians. Black women have also long been viewed as more 'sexual' than other races of women (a phenomenon known as the 'Jezebel' stereotype).

Transgender black women are more likely to get killed because of discrimination and transphobia.

Black women are less paid than white men in jobs as childcare workers, maids, housekeeping cleaners, personal care aides, and social workers.

=== Stereotypes ===
Minstrel shows often portrayed African American women as loud, masculine, aggressive, naive, subserviently caring, and obnoxious. Black women were also stereotyped and portrayed as promiscuous Jezebels. White men used the Jezebel stereotype to justify raping black women during the slave trade. The Sapphire stereotype characterizes Black women as stubborn, bitchy, bossy or hateful. The mammy stereotype is depicted as an overweight black woman who selflessly cares for White people.

== See also ==
- African-American culture
- African-American women in the civil rights movement
- African-American women in computer science
- African-American women in politics
- African National Congress Women's League
- African Women's Union of the Congo
- Black feminism
- Indigenous feminism#Australia
- Black people
- Black women filmmakers
- Black women in the music industry
- Daughters of Africa
- List of African-American women in medicine
- Women of color
- Women in Africa
- Strong black woman
- Black women in ballet
- African and African-American women in Christianity
- Australian Aboriginal culture
- List of Indigenous Australian VFL/AFL and AFL Women's players
