= Blackbuck (disambiguation) =

Blackbuck or black buck may refer to:

- Blackbuck, a species of antelope
- Black Buck, a racist epithet for African American men
- Operation Black Buck, a series of bombing raids by the RAF during the Falklands War
- Royal Regiment of Fusiliers, known as the Indian Blackbucks
