= BBC (sexual slang) =

Sexual slang for penises of black men

Big black cock, usually shortened to BBC, is a racist sexual slang term and a genre of ethnic pornography that focuses on black men with large penises. The term is often used in both straight and gay pornography.

== Description ==
The designation refers to the stereotype of black men having large penises, and has been described by some critics as portraying black men as animalistic and aggressive. The trope is typically invoked in the promotion of pornography featuring a black male performer and a female performer, although homosexual examples are sometimes promoted on social media, most notably through content associated with the Indonesian "Jomok" subculture, which revolves around recontextualising pornographic clips featuring gay black men to appear more humorous.

The stereotype appears in gay, bisexual, and straight media, with the "BBC" acronym also being "ubiquitous among gay men on dating sites, in pornography, and in other gay sexual spaces. Its use extends beyond penis size itself to encompass a number of sexual traits that would establish Black men as prized sexual partners. It often includes specific mention of dominance, aggressiveness, and submission of the White partner," according to sexuality studies scholar Logan D. Trevon. The term also appears in connection with cuckoldry fetishism.

== Reception ==
The term carries racist connotations, to embody the fetishization of black men, and to perpetuate harmful stereotypes about the physical features and sexual appetites and inclinations of black men.

Writer and activist Rhammel Afflick said he had found that "my worth is often only perceived sexually. There are always references to me having a 'BBC' (big black cock)".

Lerone Clarke-Oliver opined in The Gay Times that "seeing Black men in porn labelled as 'Thugs' or, 'BBC' (to name but two harmful categorisations) or 'Black [insert search term] has off-line and real-world psychological consequences".

As of 2022, the term, "BBC", was the 20th most searched category of pornography on Pornhub. This was noted to be a decrease from previous years.

== Critical engagement with trope ==
Robert Mapplethorpe, Man in Polyster Suit, photograph, 1980

Robert Mapplethorpe's 1980 work, Man in a Polyster Suit, is an example of an artist's critical engagement with the trope of the big black cock, offering what Dennis Barrie, former director of the Contemporary Arts Center said was "a complex message about race and black men and black power and black sexuality"

== See also ==
- Race and sexuality
- Sexual fetishism
- Stereotypes of African Americans
- Black Buck
