= Joycelyn Wilson =

Professor in Black media studies

- Born: Tuscaloosa, Alabama, United States
- Occupation: Academic
- Website: www.drjoyce.net

Joycelyn Wilson is an assistant professor of hip hop studies and digital humanities in the Black Media Studies cohort, located in the school of literature, media, and communication in the Ivan Allen College at the Georgia Institute of Technology. As an educational anthropologist, Wilson is an expert in African-American music and performance - with interests in contemporary modes of cultural production in the American South and Hip Hop in general, as well as their broad impact on higher education. She is the founder and CEO of the HipHop2020 Archive and Innovation Lab, an educational resources design studio inspired by the Hip Hop Archive.

== Early life ==
Born in Tuscaloosa, Alabama, Wilson grew up in Southwest Atlanta "SWATS" neighborhood. She graduated from Benjamin E. Mays High School before enrolling in University of Georgia, where she completed her BS in Mathematics and PhD in Educational Anthropology. She has a Master's from Pepperdine University.

== Career ==
Wilson has written for several publications, including FADER, XXL, The Source, Rap Pages, and wax poetics - often introducing new artists to a wider audience. She is a music and culture columnist for The Bitter Southerner, where she writes about the history of Atlanta culture, Down South Hip Hop, Trap, race, and technology. Wilson has expertise in pop culture, social justice content production, and justice-oriented humanities instruction in STEAM (science, technology, engineering, arts, and mathematics). She is an Emmy-nominated documentary film producer by the Southeast division of the National Academy of Television Arts and Sciences (NATAS). Her academic work focusses on the impact and legacy of Atlanta rap duo Outkast and Down South Hip Hip Studies as an area of study.

== Public engagement ==
Wilson consults with educational leaders, politicians, community organizations, and corporations. Wilson speaks on pop culture, Atlanta Hip Hop, schooling in American society, and the cultural histories of civil rights and social justice in the South.

== See also ==
- Ratchet feminism
