= Ethnic pornography =

Genre of pornography that depicts a specific ethnic group of performers

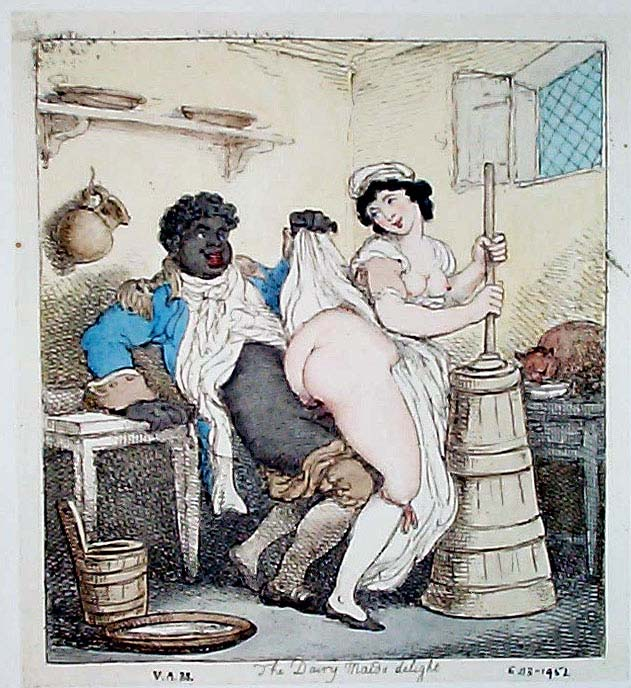
"The Dairy Maid's Delight", a drawing by Thomas Rowlandson (1756–1827)

Ethnic pornography is a genre of pornography featuring performers of specific ethnic groups, or depictions of interracial sexual activity.

Productions can feature any type of ethnic group; however, the most commonly marketed ethnic genres involve Asian women, Latino women, and black women, most often paired with white men.

== Demographics ==
The most prevalent form of ethnic pornography is that which involves Asian females. According to Christopher Mcgahan, himself citing a July 2005 Yahoo! Adullt Galleries directory, pornographic websites depicting Asian female actresses outnumber almost all other forms of hardcore pornography. Websites explicitly depicting Latina or black women are also commonly found; however, ethnic pornography featuring white women tends to be more obscure and found within the ambiguous "interracial" category; few websites mark "white" as a distinct racial category.

According to a 2019 study published in Archives of Sexual Behavior, the most common form of interracial pornography involves white men paired with either Asian, Latina, or black women. In terms of "most watched" videos, the most common form was white men with Latina women. Interracial videos involving black and white individuals were equally distributed across gender pairings, at 15.1%. White women were present in 37.2% of all videos (including non-interracial pornography), while white male actors were present in 55.2% of all videos.

=== Hijabi pornography ===
==== 2022 content analysis study ====
In a 2022 study published in Violence Against Women (Sage Journals), Mirzaei et al. investigated the increase in interest for HPVs ("hijab pornographic videos", defined by the authors as films portraying at least one female performer as wearing a head covering in a way that "accentuates Muslim women's culturally specific way of dressing"). The authors contended this type of pornography to be distinct from "race porn", due to the potency of head coverings in such films as a marker of religious identity rather than what the authors identify as inherently racial (skin colour given as the example).

Using the search term "hijab porn", the authors gathered 50 professional-looking HPVs from four named popular porn sites. The videos were restricted to exclude non-English-language speech. The authors analysed aggression, objectification, exploitation, and agency (tables below contain specific numerical data). The following comparisons against previous studies were made:

Prevalence of "aggression" in HPVs according to Mirzaei et al. (2022)
| Act | Frequency (% of videos) |
|---|---|
| Gagging | 44 |
| Spanking | 38 |
| Pushing | 24 |
| "Insulting" (e.g. "whore") | 22 |
| Confining | 20 |
| Slapping | 14 |
| "Verbal threatening" (e.g. when "a husband threatened his wife that he would whip her again if she continued to cheat on him") | 10 |
| Choking | 10 |
| "Hate speech" (e.g. "Muslim bitch") | 6 |
| "Torturing" (e.g. waterboarding) | 2 |
| Whipping | 2 |

With regard to aggression, the authors noted that the eminence of spanking and gagging as the most frequent acts was consistent with similar studies. In contrast, the authors noted that the proportion of aggression targets being women was "much higher than figures given by recent studies".

Prevalence of "objectification" in HPVs according to Mirzaei et al. (2022)
| Indicator | | Frequency (% of videos) |
|---|---|---|
| Focus on body parts and/or face | Mostly on male | 0 |
| Focus on body parts and/or face | Mostly on female | 100 |
| Focus on body parts and/or face | Equal focus | 0 |
| Fellatio | | 96 |
| Cum shot | | 22 |
| Creampie | | 10 |
| Double penetration | | 6 |
| Simultaneous stimulation of more than one man | | 4 |

With regard to objectification, the authors noted that the prevalence of fellatio was "significantly higher than the proportions reported in previous studies" and that in "almost all" depictions of a cum shot, semen was ejaculated onto the female's face whilst she was wearing a headscarf. The authors argued that "hijab seems to be the target of objectification".

Prevalence of "exploitation" in HPVs according to Mirzaei et al. (2022)
| Indicator | | Frequency (% of videos) |
|---|---|---|
| Hierarchal status | Man in higher status (e.g. businessman vs. maid given as example) | 50 |
| Hierarchal status | Woman in higher status (teacher vs. student) | 10 |
| Hierarchal status | Equal status | 6 |
| Hierarchal status | Unclear | 34 |
| Nonconsensual sex | Man is forced to have sex | 0 |
| Nonconsensual sex | Woman is forced to have sex | 32 |
| Age gap (>20 years) | Man older | 28 |
| Age gap (>20 years) | Woman older | 0 |
| Exchange (sex for money) | Man exploited | 2 |
| Exchange (sex for money) | Woman exploited | 14 |
| Female "tricked" into having sex | | 2 |

With regard to exploitation, the authors contended that the results differed from those of other studies. In reference to a 2015 study, they noted the higher likelihood for women to be portrayed as lower in status. They noted that depictions of female submission in HPVs comprised housewives, cleaners, shoplifters, and impoverished people, but – unlike a referenced 2014 study – not as students, models, tenants, waitresses, or employees. They noted that 16% of the depictions contained survival sex and 32% contained nonconsensual sex. They noted that nonconsensual sex "rarely occurred" in other studies.

Prevalence of "agency" in HPVs according to Mirzaei et al. (2022)
| Indicator | | Frequency (% of videos) |
|---|---|---|
| Dominance/submission | Man dominant (the woman being "predominantly in a bottom position or obedient") | 98 |
| Dominance/submission | Woman dominant | 2 |
| Dominance/submission | Equal | 0 |
| Pleasure | Focus on male pleasure | 86 |
| Pleasure | Focus on female pleasure | 2 |
| Pleasure | Equal focus | 12 |
| Reciprocity | Male orgasm | 32 |
| Reciprocity | Female orgasm | 2 |
| Reciprocity | Both | 0 |
| Reciprocity | Neither | 66 |
| Sexual experience | Man more experienced | 56 |
| Sexual experience | Woman more experienced | 2 |
| Sexual experience | Equal | 42 |
| Initiated sex | Man | 72 |
| Initiated sex | Woman | 12 |
| Initiated sex | Unclear | 14 |
| Stimulation of female genitalia by a male | | 28 |

With regard to agency, the authors noted that the androcentrism was "in accordance with the current literature". They noted that unlike in previous studies, female self-touch was "rarely observed" in the HPVs. They noted that the gap between male and female orgasm aligned with results in other studies. They noted that sex initiation skewed towards men more than in other studies. They noted that the gender disparity in sexual experience differed from that in other studies, referring to one female assertion of virginity, and one instance of male anger at a female performer "too clumsy at fellatio".

== Interracial pornography in the United States ==
Interracial pornography features performers of differing racial and ethnic backgrounds and often employs ethnic and racial stereotypes in its depiction of performers.

American stag films dated to the 1930s depict acts between black and white performers: Di Lauro and Rabin point to The Handy Man, The Hypnotist, and A Stiff Game, the last of which identifies its only male character as "Sambo".

Behind the Green Door (1972) was one of the first pornographic films to feature sex between a white actress (Marilyn Chambers) and a black actor (Johnnie Keyes).

In the past, some of American pornography's white actresses were allegedly warned to avoid African American males, both on-screen and in their personal lives. One rationale was the purportedly widespread belief that appearing in interracial pornography would ruin a white performer's career, although some observers have said that there is no evidence that this is true. Adult Video News critic Sheldon Ranz wrote in 1997 that:

We keep hearing a lot about "the powers that be" that tell white women that it's not in their "interest" to work with blacks. Is there any proof that Ginger's scene with Tony El-Lay in Undressed Rehearsal hurt her career? Nina Hartley still gets lots of bookings in Southern strip clubs, especially Texas, even though she is an avowed interracialist.

Lexington Steele told The Root in a 2013 interview that white female performers who appear in interracial pornography may conceal their careers due to social pressure from their intimates. According to a survey by Jon Millward, while 87% of porn actresses are willing to take a facial, only 53% will do interracial porn.

=== Alleged role of agents ===
Sophie Dee, prominent figure of the genre, said in a 2010 interview that she thought agents often pressure white female performers not to appear in interracial pornography. Dee said that they will be paid better for performing with black men and their careers will not be damaged in any way, pointing at positive examples of some Vivid Entertainment actresses.

Aurora Snow noted in a 2013 article that the major factor preventing several white actresses from doing interracial scenes is "career anxiety" imposed by agents rather than their own racial bias. Tee Reel, male porn star and one of the few black agents in the U.S. industry, had a concurring opinion, saying, "In the business, some girls who say they don't do interracial, I've actually had sex with, off-camera." Porn star Kristina Rose has alleged that some agents tell younger actresses that they will earn less from performing in interracial pornography to bar their involvement, although the opposite is true on a global level.

== Ethnic pornography in France ==
Jean-Daniel Cadinot, Jean-Noël René Clair, and Stéphane Chibikh were some of the first French gay pornographers to feature Franco-Arab actors. Many of Chibikh's films display actors of color resisting the French state and its policemen and administrators. Critics have argued that these productions romanticize poverty, pit white people and people of color against one another, showcase "outlaw" S&M, bareback, and intergenerational porn, and legitimize negative stereotypes of Arabs.

== Scholarly criticism ==
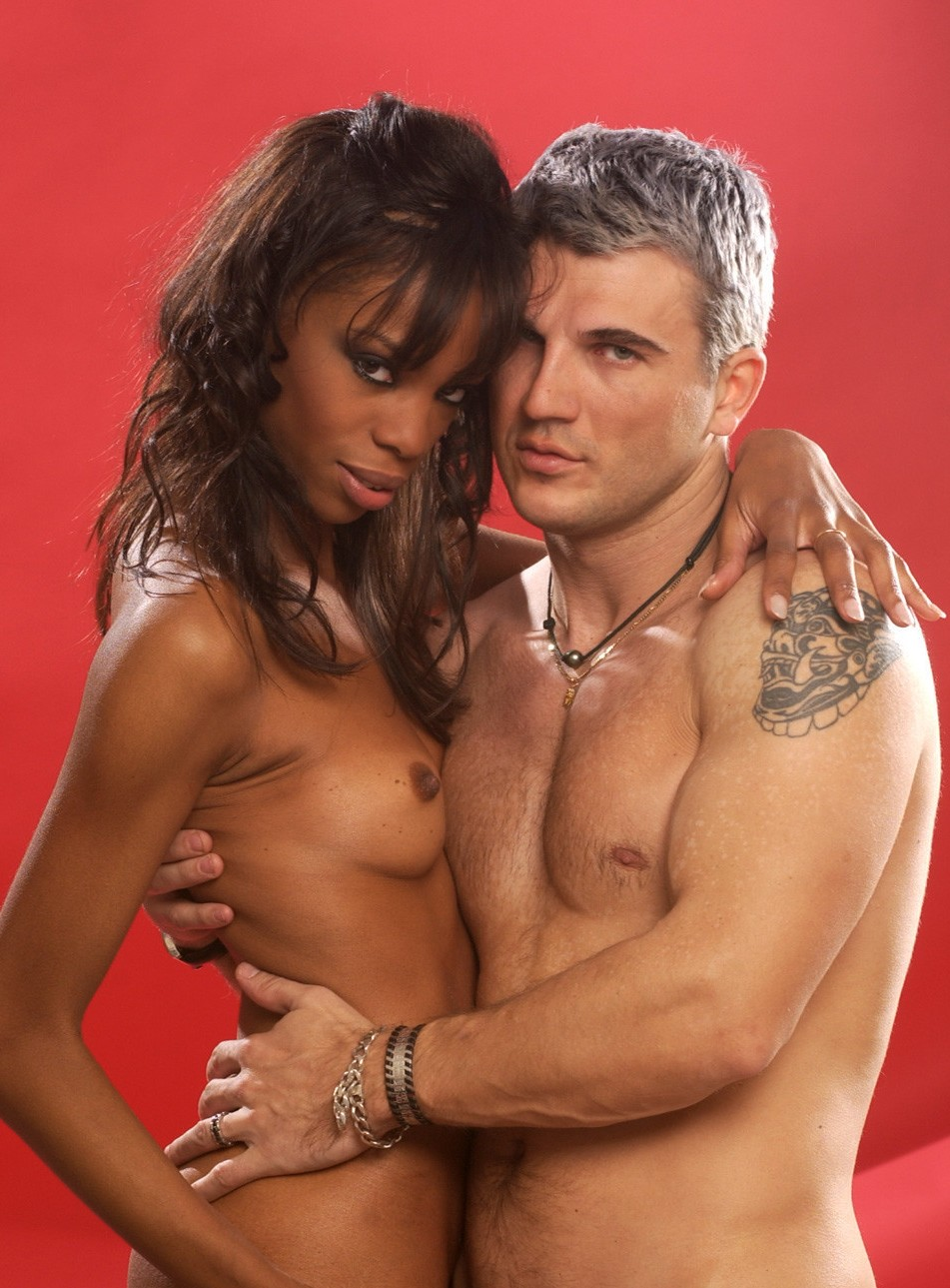
Interracial pornography featuring a black woman and a white man

In Chapter 3 of her book Porn Studies, Linda Williams, professor at the University of California, Berkeley, examines the film Crossing the Color Line starring Sean Michaels, a black actor, and Christi Lake, a white actress. In the interviews portion of the film, Michaels and Lake express how being "color-blind" is a progressive approach to interracial porn. Williams identifies a contradiction between these interviews and the subsequent performance, in which both actors make several references to the differences in skin color between them. For example, Lake refers to Michaels' genitalia as a "big black dick". Williams argues that by pointing out racial differences, race is being made the main point of intrigue for the audience, which perpetuates the exotification of racial differences. She argues that the eroticized sexual tension in interracial pornography dates back in American history to slavery.

Mireille Miller-Young, professor of feminist studies at University of California, Santa Barbara, argues that while the porn industry hypersexualizes African-American pornographic actresses, they are often paid less, hired less, and given less attention during health checks than their white counterparts.

== See also ==
- Asian fetish
- Cuckold fetish
- Miscegenation
- Misogynoir
- Pornography by region
- Racial fetishism

== Sources ==
- van Veenendaal, Hester; et al. (2018). "Practical Considerations for Using Online Methods to Engage Patients in Guideline Development". Patient - Patient-Centered Outcomes Research. 11(6): 633-640. doi:10.1007/ S10508-018-1304-6.
- McCormack, Mark (2013). "The Declining Significance of Homophobia: How Teenage Boys Are Redefining Masculinity and Heterosexuality". Sexualities. 17 (1-2): 123-139. doi:10.1177/1363460713511100.
- Hubbard, Phil (2020). "Kissing Is Not a Universal Right: Sexuality, Space, and the Geographies of Intimacy". Political Geography. 80: 102188. doi:10.1080/14650045.2020.1755266
