= Independent woman =

Pop culture term

"Independent woman" is a term explored by various sources in popular culture.

== Rap music ==
The archetype of the "independent woman" is particularly emphasized today in the hip- hop genre in which male and female rappers discuss it frequently. Moody, Professor of Journalism at Baylor University described the "independent black woman" phenomenon in two 2011 articles titled "A rhetorical analysis of the meaning of the 'independent woman'" and "The meaning of 'Independent Woman' in music".

The articles indicated that the lyrics and videos of male and female rappers portrayed "independent women" differently. Using the concept of intersectionality, Moody's rhetorical analysis combined feminist and critical cultural theories to explore the meanings of the 'independent woman' in the lyrics and respective videos of male and female rappers. She concluded that songs by various artists, corresponding music videos, and viewer comments contained four main messages: wealth equals independence, beauty and independence are connected, average men deserve perfect women, and sexual prowess equals independence. Male rappers were more likely to include messages of beautiful, overachieving women paired with average men, while female rappers focus on their own sexual prowess.

== Other perspectives ==
- Presenting a different viewpoint, Darryl James, a blogger and author of “Bridging The Black Gender Gap,” asserts that the phrase “independent woman” has gone excessively far and its meaning is inconsistent and in many ways “cartoonish, mannish and just plain unattractive.” He adds that in the quest for so-called “independence,” some women have given up substantial portions of their womanhood, which has been detrimental to fostering meaningful relationships in the black community.
- Tina Portis, an entrepreneur and former single mother of three, depicted independence as a natural part of adulthood. Her 2010 video clip posted to YouTube has more than 22,406 views and hundreds of comments. In the video, she asserts that independent women do not need a pat on the back for doing what grownups are supposed to do: pay their bills; buy houses and cars, etc. (Portis, 2010).
- PBS weighed in with its interpretation in "The Independent Woman", episode 1 of its 2011 documentary series America in Primetime. It reveals how women have transformed from model housewives to complex, and sometimes controversial, characters.

== See also ==
- Angry Black Woman
- Black American princess
