= Ratchet (slang) =

Slang term in hip hop

YouTube content creator attempting to behave in a ratchet manner

Ratchet is a slang term in American hip hop culture that, in its original sense, was a derogatory term used to refer to an uncouth woman, and may be a Louisianan dialect form of the word "wretched".

In the 2000s–2010s, the word became loosely connotative of denoting overt confidence, defiance, fervor, or otherwise being descriptive of actions displaying boisterous and unruly behavior (similar to that of the male archetype "bad boy") when attributed to a person. It is primarily used in street slang and is popular among African American women. Originally explicitly derogatory, the term can be interpreted as positive or derogatory, based on the subject.

The term may also be used to describe a handgun.

== History ==
Since the late 1990s, rappers from Shreveport, Louisiana, have used the term in their songs. Its usage is recorded early as 1992 by Pimp C of UGK in the song "I'm So Bad" from the album Too Hard to Swallow. Outside of Louisiana, it was used again in 1998 in rapper E-40's "Lieutenant Roast a Botch" track from his album The Element of Surprise. The word also appears in publication in 1999, with the song "Do the Ratchet" on the album Ratchet Fight in the Ghetto by Anthony Mandigo from Shreveport, Louisiana. Mandigo reportedly learned the term from his grandmother. In 2004, Lil' Boosie, in conjunction with Mandigo, recorded a new version of "Do the Ratchet". The CD liner notes define ratchet as: "n., pron., v, adv., 1. To be ghetto, real, gutter, nasty. 2. It's whatever, bout it."

== Usage ==
In its original US sense, the term referred to an uncouth woman, and may be a Louisianan dialect form of the word "wretched". The term has since been extended to have broader meanings and connotations and is no longer strictly bound by race or gender.

The term gained popularity in 2012 through music artists and celebrities. It has been used in ways similar to the word "ghetto". "Ratchet" can be used as an adjective, noun, or verb.

In 2024, on the first episode of John Mulaney Presents: Everybody's in LA, Ray J said he loved the word ratchet. He described his genre as ratchet reality TV, which he defined by saying, "Ratchet means like a high-level, high-octane, dramatic kind of television show, um, that sometimes has fights here and there."

=== Reclamation ===
The word has evolved to have many different meanings, and it can have either a positive or negative connotation. Some African-American women have reappropriated the word and embraced the meaning, including to describe ratchet feminism, whereas others point to how the term reinforces the negative portrayal of African-American women in the media. The term has also been reappropriated to describe a mode of intersectional analysis associated with African-American LGBT culture.

== In music ==
Numerous musicians have used the term "ratchet" in their songs. In November 2012, LL Cool J released a single called "Ratchet". In December 2012, Beyoncé posted a picture of herself wearing earrings that contained the word "ratchet". Juicy J, Lil Debbie, Cam'ron, Future, and Lil' Boosie are some other artists who have also used the term in their music. Miley Cyrus had been criticized by some as appropriating ratchet culture. The term and concept of ratchet was displayed in the 2013 YouTube video by Emmanuel and Phillip Hudson, "Ratchet Girl Anthem- SHE RACHEEET!". Lil Peep and producer Diplo made the record "RATCHETS" featuring Lil Tracy. The day that Lil Peep died, Lil Tracy uploaded a song to SoundCloud called "Ratchet Bitches Cocaina" and removed it shortly afterwards. Megan Thee Stallion used the term in the chorus of her 2020 viral hit, "Savage". Lizzo used the term in the chorus of her 2021 single, "Rumors", which features Cardi B.

== See also ==
- Angry black woman
- Ratchet feminism
- Raunch aesthetics
