= Respectability politics =

Political strategy

Respectability politics, or the politics of respectability, is a political strategy wherein members of a marginalized community will consciously abandon or punish controversial aspects of their cultural-political identity as a method of assimilating, achieving social mobility, and gaining the respect of the majority culture.

The term "politics of respectability" was coined by historian Evelyn Brooks Higginbotham in 1993. According to her, respectability "emphasize[s] reform of individual behavior and attitudes both as a goal in itself and as a strategy for the reform of the entire structural system of American race relations." Respectability politics is also the process in which privileged members of marginalized groups settle within the social norms of the dominant groups, to advance their group's position.

Early examples of respectability politics were organizations such as the Association of German National Jews or the German Vanguard, during the Weimar Republic and the early years of Nazi Germany. These groups sought recognition or assimilation through their outspoken alignment with the ideology and values of the regime, while failing to realize that Nazi antisemitism was not merely a rhetorical tool or a manageable risk.

== Differences in respectability politics and respectability narratives ==
Respectability narratives depict a marginalized group sharing similar traits, values, and morals to the dominant culture. When it comes to respectability narratives, they are an accumulation of different individual ideas about a group or identity politics. This usually aligns with the dominant group's definition of "respectability." Respectability politics is also a school of thought, using narratives that demonstrate respectability to enact social, political, and legal change. This is prominent throughout U.S. history. Certain political figures and activists have pointed out that the similar traits between the dominant and marginalized groups would provide rationale for marginalized groups seeking out equal rights and opportunities.

== Concept ==
When marginalized figures promote respectability politics, they may be attempting to gain social credibility by regulating the "undesirable" beliefs and behaviors of the other members in their social group. Proponents of respectability politics might attempt to portray their personal social values as being continuous and compatible with the dominant group's values. These supporters may prefer not to challenge the mainstream for its failure to accept the marginalized group into the mainstream and that diversity also exists within the group.

According to Performing a Vanilla Self by scholars Alice Marwick and Mikaela Pitcan, respectability politics consists of three main facets. The first is to reinforce a hierarchy contrasted between a respectable individual and a shameful other. The second is to encourage people to defy stereotypes attributed to different aspects of their identity in attempts to present one's self as respectable. Finally, the third facet involves tailoring one's behavior to better comply with white, middle-class cultural norms, and consequently reinforcing the status quo. A hypothetical example of this in play would be a person who chooses to speak standard American English, as opposed to African-American vernacular English, to a non-Black audience as a method of aligning themself with white cultural norms.

== Black respectability politics ==
The term "politics of respectability" was first used in the context of Black women and their efforts to distance themselves from the stereotypical and frowned-upon aspects of their communities. Respectability politics continues to influence the behaviour of racially marginalized Black individuals in the 21st century who gain status and rights by "adhering to hegemonic standards of what it means to be respectable". Black individuals practicing respectability politics are stereotyped as being most concerned with laziness, intellectual inferiority, violence, and immorality.

While respectability politics has been an important way for Black citizens of the United States to integrate into their free lives post-emancipation, there is also a notion that "a deliberate concession to mainstream societal values" does not promote respect. Instead it is seen as a defense mechanism of minority communities. Some research studies associate part of the high burden of mental health problems with Black Americans on assimilationist behaviors. Researchers Hedwig Lee and Margaret Takako Hicken argue that further conversations about respectability politics should always consider the challenges Black Americans negotiate in everyday social spaces, and establish how they impact Black American mental health.

The development of African-American politics of respectability has been traced to writers and activists, such as W. E. B. Du Bois and Booker T. Washington, and has been used as a way of understanding the election and political trajectory of Barack Obama. Obama has been criticized for his use of respectability politics during his presidency, such as the time he brought up issues of Black criminality during his speech following the November 24th grand jury decision regarding the shooting of Michael Brown in Ferguson, Missouri. One of the most open proponents of respectability politics is former basketball player Charles Barkley. Scholars have linked the television series Black-ish to a variety of intersections and fiscal perspectives springing from Black respectability politics.

== Origin ==
In her 1993 book Righteous Discontent: The Women's Movement in the Black Baptist Church, 1880–1920, historian Evelyn Brooks Higginbotham coined the term "the politics of respectability" to describe social and political changes in the Black community during that time. She particularly focused on the revitalization of the Black Baptist Church and how it became a location of self-help for Blacks. This was particularly true for Black women, who used the church as a location of resistance against racism and dehumanization. These women built schools and provided social welfare services to enhance their respectability and promote their communities.

This type of mobilization continued and infiltrated the methodology of teachers in Black communities in the Jim Crow South. Teachers encouraged their students to integrate themselves into white, middle class communities in the hopes of motivating and inspiring students to escape racial injustice. These teachers viewed their profession as a political act, helping young Black students disassociate from negative stereotypes. Black communities were expected to integrate themselves into white society and act white in order to gain access to political benefits.

In the book Black Power: The Politics of Liberation, Kwame Ture, formerly known as Stokely Carmichael, and Charles V. Hamilton illustrate how the town of Tuskegee, Alabama is not recognized in politics by white politicians. Ture and Hamilton go on to argue that Black people constantly have to prove themselves to white people, a never-ending cycle because once one aspect of being white is achieved, another obstacle is placed in their way.

=== Health implications of respectability politics ===
On an individual level, respectability politics can manifest itself in impression management behaviors. Across all socioeconomic levels, there are some Black people who agree that partaking in impression management is necessary in order to navigate everyday life in a racialized society. However, these behaviors, also referred to as vigilant behaviors, can have negative consequences on people. In this specific case, vigilance can be defined as "anticipatory and ruminative thoughts and behaviors involved in the preparation for discriminatory treatment and mirror behaviors that align with the presentation of self strategies encouraged by proponents of Black respectability politics but likely utilized by many African Americans to engage in racially hierarchical social spaces."

For many Black people, vigilant behaviors take the form of altering one's presentation of self, including one's dress, manner of speech, etc., "avoiding social situations where likelihood of discrimination may be higher," and "daily preparation for possible experiences with prejudice and discrimination." Research shows that this anticipatory stress can often be detrimental to one's health because this activates the body's primary stress response system, known as the hypothalamic pituitary adrenal (HPA) axis. Activating the HPA axis is known to help the body to better deal with said stress. However, when the anticipatory stress is very frequent, it can cause "dysfunction of the stress response system and then poor mental and physical health."

=== Black Lives Matter ===
The Black Lives Matter movement is an example of a movement against respectability politics. The movement was motivated by the shooting and death of Trayvon Martin, an unarmed Black teenager. The number of subsequent police killings of unarmed Black men that gained broad national attention motivated a conversation about racial stereotypes and why certain racial stereotypes came to imply that Black men are "dangerous". The Black Lives Matter movement argues that people are deserving of rights regardless of "any ostensibly non-respectable behaviour." Instead of acknowledging and shying away from negative Black stereotypes, the Black Lives Matter movement works to expand the concept of what it means to be "respectable" and argues that negatively stereotyped behaviour should not be met with deadly force.

In line with the growth of the Black Lives Matter movement, some celebrities who have typically shied away from conversations about race began to engage with the topic. For example, at the beginning of her career, popular television producer and creator Shonda Rhimes aired shows that had colourblind scripts, despite having diverse casts (e.g. Grey's Anatomy). This was consistent with modern respectability politics in what is sometimes argued to be a post-racial era. Today, Rhimes engages in conversations about racial inequality in the media and addresses racially charged topics on her show, pushing against respectability politics and affirming the rights of all people regardless of their "respectability".

=== Rebranding "ratchet" and anti-respectability politics ===
One method used to challenge respectability politics is the reclaiming of negative stereotypes associated with minority communities, rather than disassociating from them. This can take place in the form of rebranding words that have been used as insults towards communities.

Reclamation of the derogatory term "ratchet" has been one way that Black women specifically have pushed back against respectability politics. Black women who identify as ratchet reclaim the negative stereotypes associated with Black culture, such as hyper-sexuality, and embrace individualism. The strategy of reclaiming negative stereotypes has been acknowledged as having potential for Black feminine liberation, but has also been criticized for its limitations contained within the confines of the terms that are being reconceptualized. For example, ratchet is associated with heterosexuality, which confines potential to liberate in the context of being "ratchet".

== LGBTQ respectability politics ==
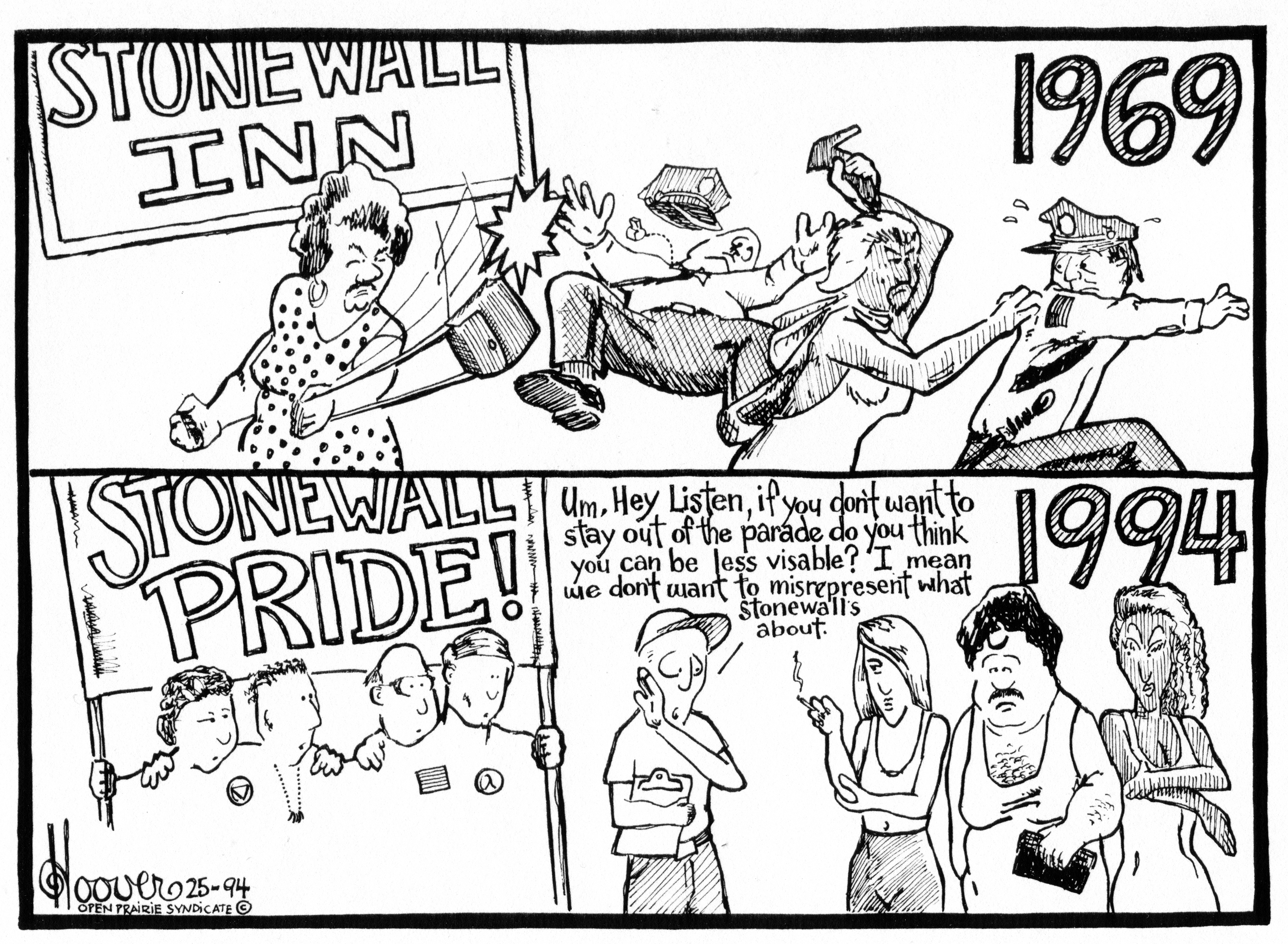
Cartoon satirizing exclusionary LGBTQ respectability politics, 1994

Respectability politics in the context of the LGBTQ community is the assimilation of LGBTQ or otherwise marginalized people based on sexuality or transgender status into a hegemonic and heteronormative society. This can be achieved by downplaying stereotypes or behaviors associated with homosexuality, e.g., crossdressing or flamboyant dressing, public displays of same-sex affection, or participating in cisgender heterosexual institutions. There are many perspectives on whether engaging in respectability politics is the best way for LGBTQ people to gain acceptance. One perspective is that assimilation is an important and necessary way for the LGBTQ community to gain rights, and once they are integrated into society they will have more space to challenge mainstream institutions to make them more inclusive. Another perspective is that assimilation only reinforces cisgender heteronormative institutions and makes diversity invisible. Some LGBTQ people, for instance, choose to identify themselves as straight-acting, creating controversy within the community.

Campaigners for LGBTQ rights have struggled with the issue of respectability politics. A distinction has been drawn between an attitude that celebrated and affirmed sexual difference in 1960s gay rights campaigns, and contemporary approaches that seek to reduce and underplay sexual differences. Gay people are portrayed as having similar values to the wider cisgender heteronormative society, which is considered "a pride ... premised on a nonconscious agreement with dominant views about what is shameful".

J. Bryan Lowder, writer for Slate, named Caitlyn Jenner as an advocate of respectability politics in the transgender community. "Since the beginning of the civil rights movement for gays, lesbians, and bisexuals," she writes, "there have been individuals who attempted to gain straight society's approval by distancing themselves from—or stepping over the bodies of—more 'radical' elements of the community. ... Respectability politics in the trans community, at least on the public stage, is a newer phenomenon, but it appears that Jenner is positioning herself to lead the way."

=== Marriage equality ===
An example of respectability politics used by the LGBTQ community in the United States was the 2015 Obergefell v. Hodges Supreme Court ruling that legalized same-sex marriage. Much of the mainstream argument to include the LGBTQ community in a heteronormative institution like marriage was that the inclusion of LGBTQ people in marriage would not challenge nor change traditional marriage values, like monogamy. In order to benefit from marriage as an institution, the LGBTQ community argued that their relationships were much akin and perpetuated the same values as heterosexual relationships.

=== LGB Separatism ===
The "Drop the T" movement is a separatist intra-community movement coined in 2015 to disassociate transgender people from the LGBT community and encourage LGBTQ organizations to revoke their support of the transgender community. It has been widely condemned by many LGBTQ groups as transphobic. Meredith Talusan claims that this rejection is an example of cisgender LGB people attempting to form splintering identities that are more socially acceptable, at the expense of marginalizing the vilified "other." Some other organizations, with a similar aim of denouncing the transgender community in order to appear more respectable, include trans-exclusionary radical feminists and the LGB Alliance.

== Women ==
In the United States, there are gender inequalities that define respectable behaviour for both men and women. Historically, women's respectability has been defined by certain feminine attributes that, when followed, lead to certain rights and benefits such as reduced femicide rates, whereas men’s responsibilities to respectability are often ignored to the point of nonexistence. Women's respectability politics is founded on women abiding by stereotypes of femininity. This makes it fundamentally different to LGBTQ and Black respectability politics, whose respectabilities are established by them not abiding by the stereotypes within their own groups.

Modern respectability politics for women are further complicated by inconsistent societal pressures for women, in regards to sexuality. According to Lara Karaian, a professor from Carleton University, women receive mixed messages about what is respectable sexual behaviour, which leads to sexual victimization and slut-shaming, most often for young girls.

=== Fashion ===
One way in which women can abide by respectability politics is through their clothing. The ways in which women dress is highly indicative of their place and level of respectability within society and the community. Women who dress respectably are more likely to be admitted into social and political institutions. This precedent became most apparent in the Victorian era.

=== Marriage ===
According to scholars such as Simone de Beauvoir, getting married is an example of respectability politics for women and men. While being married gives participants access to benefits such as health care and tax benefits, de Beauvoir argues that this comes with the necessity to abide by bourgeois respectability. This type of respectability is specific to women, and requires that women "perform a service in the marriage", which includes satisfying men's sexual needs and caring for the household. Today, respectability politics within marriages may be mitigated by greater levels of economic and social equality between men and women.

== Asian Americans ==
In response to the elevated rate of hate crimes against Asians during COVID-19 pandemic, Andrew Yang, a 2nd-generation Taiwanese immigrant who ran as a Democratic Presidential candidate in the 2020 United States presidential election, suggested in his Washington Post op-ed that "Asian Americans need to embrace and show our American-ness in ways we never have before. ... We should show without a shadow of a doubt that we are Americans who will do our part for our country in this time of need." This claim has been widely criticized by other Asian American public figures. David Inoue, Executive Director of the Japanese American Citizens League, accused Yang of "blaming the victim" and "fail[ing] to recognize the fundamental reality of the racism that leads to hate crimes" in his public letter, also in the Washington Post. Vox columnist Li Zhou suggested that Yang's comment "[embodies] respectability politics" and "places the pressure for combating racism on people of color".

== Respectability politics online ==
Scholars have discussed how young people of low socioeconomic status manage impressions online by adhering to normative notions of respectability. This is done through self-censoring, curating a neutral image, segmenting content by platform, and avoiding content and contacts coded as lower class. These strategies simultaneously enable and limit a participant's ability to succeed by reinforcing racist and sexist notions of appropriate behavior.

=== Regulating digital sexualities ===
In physical spaces, the female body has been a traditional site of respectability where norms are negotiated and traditional gender roles are upheld. Due to the intersection of racial and gender identities, women of color are further subject to critique and objectification – a topic with a long history of gendered and racialized respectability politics that center on what women wear, how they engage sexually, and how they behave in public. In our digital society, social media provides another cultural space where these identities have to be negotiated.

When adhering to respectability norms online, users consider sexual expression and whether or not they want to disclose certain social and sexual practices. In terms of sexuality, respectability politics online values sexual discretion and desexualized self-presentation. The performance of traditional gender roles and sexist social norms defines and contributes to the notion of sexuality being viewed as improper. Substantially affecting women, sexuality and respectability online concentrate on the "negative ramifications of explicit female sexuality." User content and language that projects sexually explicit material and sexualization is typically frowned upon in society, thus enticing users to self-censor their online identities and limit participation on social media to avoid negative judgement.

In the curation of an online sexuality, users must consider if their content falls inside or outside of the acceptable norms before making a post. If a post is viewed as too explicit or lewd, it is likely that that person will be subject to othering through a judgmental gaze. Sexually explicit material or nude photos serve as an example of content that online participants are more likely to view through the judgmental gaze. If a user's post is too explicit, it is likely that that individual will be perceived as an outsider, something that would not only impact their sense of identity in this space but also their ability to succeed.

In digital spaces, all users are subject to surveillance. Whether this gaze is coming from institutions, government officials, or other participants online, this gaze can directly impact an individual's ability to be perceived as a successful or educated individual. Therefore, users create these digital profiles with respectability politics in mind to avoid being depicted as an outcast. For users who wish to improve their social positioning with upward mobility, these pressures are often top-of-mind, even though digital respectability politics often reproduce racial and gendered hierarchies that are ultimately harmful for society.

== Criticism ==
Respectability politics have been criticized for being "used to rationalize racism, sexism, bigotry, hate, and violence. Respectability politics is known as a philosophy coined by black elites to fulfill the race relations made within the negative stereotypes that have belonged to black people. In America this is another form of neo-liberalism." For example, Bill Cosby "never gave voice to issues of racism, sexism, the failed public school system, health and economic disparities, mass incarceration or police brutality." Instead, he disparaged his own Black community in order to earn the approval of white conservatives, which made him controversial in the Black community.
