= Angry black woman =

Stereotype about Black American women

The angry black woman stereotype is a derogatory racial stereotype of Black American women as pugnacious, poorly mannered, and aggressive.

Among stereotypes of groups within the United States, the angry black woman stereotype is less studied by researchers than the Mammy and Jezebel archetypes.

Carolyn West categorizes the Angry Black Woman (ABW) as a variation on the "Sapphire" stereotype or, colloquially, "Sistas with Attitude". She defines the pervasive Sapphire/ABW image as "a template for portraying almost all Black women" and as serving several purposes. West paraphrases Melissa V. Harris-Perry who contends, "...because [Angry Black Women's] passion and righteous indignation is often misread as irrational anger, this image can be used to silence and shame Black women who dare to challenge social inequalities, complain about their circumstances, or demand fair treatment".

Author and professor of law at Columbia University and at the University of California, Los Angeles, Kimberlé Crenshaw defined and pioneered the analysis of the term "intersectionality" which describes this dual conflict experienced by black women specifically. In her TED talk, Crenshaw explains that black people experience a unique discrimination from white people, and women experience a unique discrimination from men. Black women, consequently, experience a unique form of discrimination from black men and white women and cannot only be judged based on the singularities of race or gender.

== History ==
The stereotype of the "angry black woman" originated in the 19th century in the United States, during a time when minstrel shows, featuring comedic skits and variety performances of white people that ridiculed African Americans, gained popularity. The stereotype has its roots in white supremacy. From the very beginning, the concept of whiteness has revolved around social control—specifically, the methods employed to ensure compliance among individuals to establish and uphold white supremacy. Since the era of chattel slavery, the stereotypes associated with Black women, which Patricia Hill Collins (2008) aptly refers to as controlling images, were created to fulfill this objective of social control. Consequently, the widely circulated hegemonic portrayals of Black women (such as Jezebel, Mammy, Sapphire, etc.) depict them as grotesque, immoral, aggressive, masculine, loud, irrational, promiscuous, unintelligent, and burdensome laborers. These representations have effectively served to dehumanize Black women, legally and morally excluding them from the protections granted to white women, while simultaneously rationalizing the commodification of Black women.

== Sapphire stereotype as source ==
Sapphire is a term associated with the most dominant portrayals of Black women. According to the stereotype, Sapphires were perceived as malicious and stubborn, with an overbearing nature. Aside from being depicted as unnecessarily loud and violent, Sapphires were also known to have an insatiable desire for African-American men. The Sapphire is thought to be closely related to the Mammy, though instead of a comforting demeanor, she is far more sexualized. The Sapphire is often seen as abusive, possessing a strong need to dominate, and looking for opportunities to project her own unhappiness upon others. The Sapphire poses as a persistent nagger, complaining not in hopes of a solution, but rather because she herself is bitter.

Negative caricatures of Black women historically justified their exploitation. The Sapphire archetype painted enslaved women as impure, strong, masculine, dominant, and aggressive who drove their children and partners away. This archetype characterizes the Black woman as experiencing disappointment, displeasure, bitterness or rage because of her significant other. The term has also been generalized to refer to Black women who show extreme emotion. It was utilized as a means to prove oppression was not as imminent of an issue, if Whites accepted Black women who acted according to this caricature.

== The sexuality of the Jezebel stereotype ==
The Jezebel is a stereotype used to refer to fair-skinned, slimmer, and lighter-eyed Black women, becoming hyper-sexualized by America and its media soon after the Mammy trope began its decline. Similar to the Sapphire, this trope was used as a justification for the harassment and assaults against Black women, as this painted them as inherently tempestuous and beguiling. Mass Media plays an integral part in displaying Jezebel stereotypes in a modern context. Jezebel has grown to encompass new sexual scripts, such as the Gold Digger and the Freak. These new sexual scripts within hip-hop and rap, have gained momentum in popular culture and have gained considerable influence. Unfortunately for young black girls, these scripts have reduced their agency within their sexuality and significantly affect their treatment by others. The exposure to social media platforms such as YouTube, Instagram, TikTok, and more have created an environment where children learn their behaviors from people online.

The Gold Digger is a prolific figure within hip-hop and pop culture. The idea is that a woman, usually a black woman in the context of Hip Hop culture, will use sex to gain their financial needs and desires from men. Men are there to serve financial purposes, and when they can no longer provide, the Gold Digger uses sex to acquire a man who can. The 2018 viral song, "Act Up" by City Girls utilizes this theme in some of its first lines, "Stripes on my ass so he calls this pussy Tigger, fuckin' on a scammin' ass, rich ass, nigga". The Gold Digger sexual script has been exemplified in many rap songs by both women and men. Rapper Trina in her 2000 song "Da Baddest Bitch" demonstrates the Gold Digger lifestyle through her lyrics such as: "The bigger the bank, the bigger the Benz, the better the chance to get close to his rich friends" and "Bank accounts in the Philippines. Blank note to take everything".

Unlike the Gold Digger, the Freak doesn't seek financial security in exchange for sex but instead seeks nothing but to satiate her intense sexual hunger. A Freak carries no emotional ulterior motive and searches for sex "in any place, any position, and with any person". Although often described as a sexually liberated woman who takes pride in her sexual identity, the patriarchal undertones of her existence cannot be ignored. The Jezebel is described as "wanting to please men; only by doing this would they achieve both sexual gratification and personal satisfaction". So, even if a woman seeks sex for her satisfaction, it is still for the benefit of men. This is demonstrated within Rick James' 1981 song "Super Freak," where he speaks of a "very kinky girl...the kind you don't take home to mother". He acknowledges his enjoyment of being with a "freak". Still, he degrades her existence by deeming her unworthy of meeting his mother. This amoral depiction is also symbolized in Dr. Dre and Snoop Dogg's "Bitches Ain't Shit" anthem (1992), which is an explicit telling of a few occurrences of women they have experienced being both the prowling Jezebel and the aforementioned Gold Digger.

The Jezebel presents as a slave construct, depicting Black women as "promiscuous" and "lustful". During slavery, lighter-skinned women were seen as more worthy concubines to wealthy slave owners, whereas darker skinned women were more worthy for harsher labor such as field work. These slave constructs still prevail in modern contexts. With the creation and establishment of Hip Hop and Rap as a culture, Black youth found themselves in a position of creating and defining what was cool and trendy but still trapped by neocolonialism. Despite Hip Hop having significant cultural significance to the African American experience, they were still controlled by white media and, therefore, had to adhere to their expectations. Due to that, African American women in this industry were imaged after slavery constructs, such as the Jezebel. Thus, their bodies came to be redefined as sexual and temptations through media platforms such as music videos.

The Jezebel constructed a harmful perception of Black women that heavily contributed to their sexual and economic exploitation. The sexual narratives perpetuated to the public through media about black women have created stigmas and biases within the educational and juvenile justice system and made them more prone to exploitation, such as sex trafficking. Black girls are often subject to adultification and perceived as inherently sexual and promiscuous. This way of thinking has robbed them of their childhood and innocence. It has instead forced them into victimization by adults within their lives. The adverse childhood experiences that often trigger or result from an over-sexualization from a young age often make young black girls more vulnerable to domestic minor sex trafficking. Due to this, it has been found that black girls not only have a higher chance of being trafficked but are now seen as overrepresented among trafficked children despite their population. It is found that the Jezebel stereotypes have prevailed to the extent that many adults believe that black girls "know more about sex, need to be supported less, need less protection, and know more about adult topics". This, accompanied by the fact that those who enforce and uphold the law also carry these biases, places young black girls in vulnerable positions where they are forced to take responsibility for their victimization.

== Perpetuation and reproduction of the stereotype ==
With roots in slavery, the sapphire archetype was further replicated in films, shows, and literature by the early 1930s. The negative portrayals of African Americans in television and film influences perceptions of them in real life. The reinforcement of the angry Black woman stereotype through media can lead to negative interpretations of Black women's self-expression. We see this replicated as well in film, through portraying African American women as far older in order to remove sympathy garnering characteristics from Black characters. Through these media and social platforms the stereotype was cultivated and sustained.

Black women were perceived to be loud, overly expressive, and generally negative and rude in nature. The 1930s radio show Amos 'n' Andy was particularly one of the first media outlets that reinforced the stereotype. In this production two white men voiced Black characters. Among those characters were Black women. The narrative of anger, assertiveness, and frequent emasculation was echoed with characters such as Aunt Esther from Sanford and Son and Pam from Martin. Towards the early 1970s, Blaxploitation became a prominent film genre, capitalizing off of a new trope which emerged from the combination of two previous caricatures- Jezebel and Sapphire. This combination birthed a separate caricatures that took the overly sexual and aggressive perception of Black women and use it to fight crime. The Angry Black Woman was reinvented, as actresses were able use their "bodies, brains, and guns" to play as a seductress fighting crime. Actresses such as Pam Grier profited off of this genre, using her debut in Blaxploitation films to advance her career.

The pervasiveness of the angry Black woman stereotype has led many Black women to feel unable to express themselves in fear of being perceived as angry. Although often labelled as "angry" unnecessarily, Black women's anger is also characterized as unjustified in instances in which anger is warranted. Deeming Black women's anger invalid or inappropriate shifts the focus from the cause of the anger to the reaction itself. This may be a conscious or subconscious action on behalf of the individual(s) labeling a Black woman as angry in order to shift blame or responsibility.

In Shanita Hubbard's Ride or Die, she argues that the angry black woman trope reflects a "tough exterior shell" that can be "developed as a coping mechanism at a young age when we had to learn how to escape sexual advances from grown men." She believes that the trope dismisses black women's anger, instead of addressing its root cause, and elevates respectability politics.

== Relationships to other stereotypes ==
The sapphire archetype coincides with the mammy and Jezebel. All three of these archetypes uphold the angry black woman stereotype, but in different ways. In the archetype of mammy, black women were characterized as caregivers and submissive, while the Jezebel is characterized as dependent on men, promiscuous, aggressive, and arrogant. The reproduction of these archetypes in popular culture legitimized the dehumanization of black women.

Gender studies professor Deborah Gray White writes, "slave women understood the value of silence and secrecy... like all who are dependent upon the caprices of a master, they hide their real sentiments and turn toward him changeless smile or enigmatic passivity". In other words, slavery poses a direct correlation to the Black women's emotional response, being taught that a domineering personality could be viewed as threatening.

== Black feminist response ==
Black women have used various platforms and mediums to fight back against the Angry Black Women trope that has contributed to their marginalization for centuries. A number of Black women provide insight on how the stereotype is reinforced in the media, social spaces, and interpersonal interactions. Furthermore, Black women, whether if it's through activism, academia, art, or dance, affirm their rage. Through such activism and discourse, Black women have opened many conversations regarding the dismissal and scrutiny of their emotions.

Black feminists have discredited the trope of the angry Black woman and recognize the validity in a black woman's anger. Black women are demanding a more accurate representation in the media overall in order to further the progression of the Black woman. Black feminists believe that the positive aspects of a Black woman's experience should be depicted in the media as well to hinder the persistence of this stereotype.

== Portrayals ==
The aftermath of slavery not only resulted in many social, economic and political effects but also led to the delineation of negative racial stereotypes in the portrayal of black women in media. The industry frequently displayed the stereotypical ideas of black women from mammies, to sapphires, in various forms of mass communication, congruently portraying black women as people who are malevolent, prone to retaliate in an arbitrary and frightening manner, unnecessarily aggressive, and obnoxious. Similarly, these outlets also use black women in television as a peripheral character utilized for comedic relief and are associated with the connotation of Black women being the needy or obsessive seductress, lacking moral cognizance, dignity, and restraint. Black women view this differently. As in various films, lead black women actresses are consistently depicted as angry, inclined to start an argument whereas black men are portrayed in a comparatively positive manner, with somewhat relatable, redeeming qualities. Black women are often portrayed as a belligerent convict and a poor single mother with a lack of higher education. This stereotype has changed over time, however, the media still depicts black women in a negative perspective.

Feminists believe that this is still extremely prevalent today, while non-feminists assert that there is a wide variety of black characters in all forms of media today, including both stereotypes and stereotype-free characters. Both groups do note that the "angry black woman" is one of the types of characters that is sometimes portrayed. "It's been difficult to be a black women without not being angry after generations of oppression, discrimination and erasure. Black women aren't allowed to express frustration and passions without being criticized and demonized. They are labeled as loud, vindictive and always in trouble as men are allowed to get upset without constructive criticism because it can establish their masculinity. The strong black women myth often does well in movies and TV shows, but has contributed to making black women look miserable and nonproductive as opposed to other groups/races in reality."

Examples of media containing one or more "angry black woman" character include the Madea series of movies, the TV show Empire, and others:

- Sapphire, from Amos 'n' Andy
- Aunt Esther, a character in Sanford and Son
- Mrs. Murphy (portrayed by Aretha Franklin) in The Blues Brothers
- Wilhelmina Slater, a character in Ugly Betty

== Modern usage ==
This generation usage of the angry Black woman trope is excessively normalized in movies and TV shows. The angry Black woman trope often appears as a form of relief in the black community, often in a comedic sense. Most of the shows and TV shows shown today with the angry black woman trope are made or produced by black men. Take, for instance, Tyler Perry; he uses the woman trope a lot in his movies and recent TV shows. Tyler Perry is a well-known filmmaker and actor in the black entertainment industry. In 2005, Tyler Perry released the movie Diary of a Mad Black Woman. The film follows the protagonist Helen, a fragile and powerless woman married to a monster. Helen later faces her past and ultimately realizing her worth. Tyler Perry films typically have a pattern of depicting a woman's pain in extremes, showcasing the woman's pain as either strong anger or gentle forgiveness. Other contemporary examples include social-media comedian BlameItOnKway, who has also collaborated with Perry, through his character "TiTi”. BlameItOnKway presents an image of a "ghetto" woman who is always loud and has expressive hair and clothing. This imitation is supposed to show how Black women act in reality. These portrayals are often called humorous, as those types of characters are quite entertaining. But instead, they bring attention to keep spreading harmful stereotypes of black women. Movies and television shows often try to be funny or light-hearted in their portrayal of black women, but it still pushes back against black women by reinforcing stereotypes. The audiences watch over the portrayals and believe those portrayals are true. Those harmful stereotypes keep their audiences from seeing the lives of black women and their success. The true lives of women have more depth than movies and television shows depict.

== Public health ==
In regards to culturally relevant practices during mental health treatment, Ashley W, author of The angry black woman: the impact of pejorative stereotypes on psychotherapy with black women. describes "the myth of the angry Black woman that characterizes these women as aggressive, ill tempered, illogical, overbearing, hostile, and ignorant without provocation" as a negative stereotype that victimizes black women.

Black women are expected to appear strong-willed and self-sacrificing in their daily lives, regardless of the traumas they experience due to being a Black women in a dominant society. The tropes used to label black women and exposure to institutionalized racism over an extensive period can have lasting effects in the form of chronic physical and mental afflictions; the stress accompanying racial and gender-based discrimination can manifest into health issues such as anxiety, depression, substance abuse, and cardiovascular disease.

Researchers have found effective coping strategies to combat the everlasting effects of racism, such as relying heavily on spirituality and placing their belief in a non-material and non-observational being. Vernessa R. Clark, author of The Perilous Effects of Racism on Blacks, notes that there are numerous coping styles that can be both effective or ineffective, but each consists of simultaneously accepting the effects of racism while denying the White institutions and productions that promote racism.

== Hyper-visibility in workplaces ==
The Angry Black woman stereotype is one of the ways in which Black women are made hyper-visible. Hyper-visibility happens when people focus too much on someone's race, leading to their personality being disregarded. Black women often face this in workplaces while being victims of this negative stereotype that increases their risk of performance pressure and stress. It may cause them to change their behavior or appearance as it reduces their sense of identity, as well as working harder to prove their worth. The fear of stereotype threat and becoming unemployed from their workplace not only leads them to pushing themselves to tokenized by the white-dominant work force in order to be treated fairly, but it also increases their risk of mental health issues like anxiety. In predominately White workplaces, Black women are often viewed as many racial stereotypes along which they are being undervalued, preventing them from expressing their authentic personality and skills. White and Black colleagues can express many types of emotions at work, although Black women's stress are often misperceived as anger, usually when dealing with poorly managed conflicts, and happiness.

== See also ==
- Strong black woman
- Angry white man
- Black Buck
- Black feminism
- Cholo
- Criminal stereotype of African Americans
- Diary of a Tired Black Man
- Double bind
- Dragon Lady
- Ratchet (slang)
- Fiery Latina and the hot señorita
- Karen (slang)
- White Fragility
