= Race and sexuality =

Intercultural and interracial sexuality

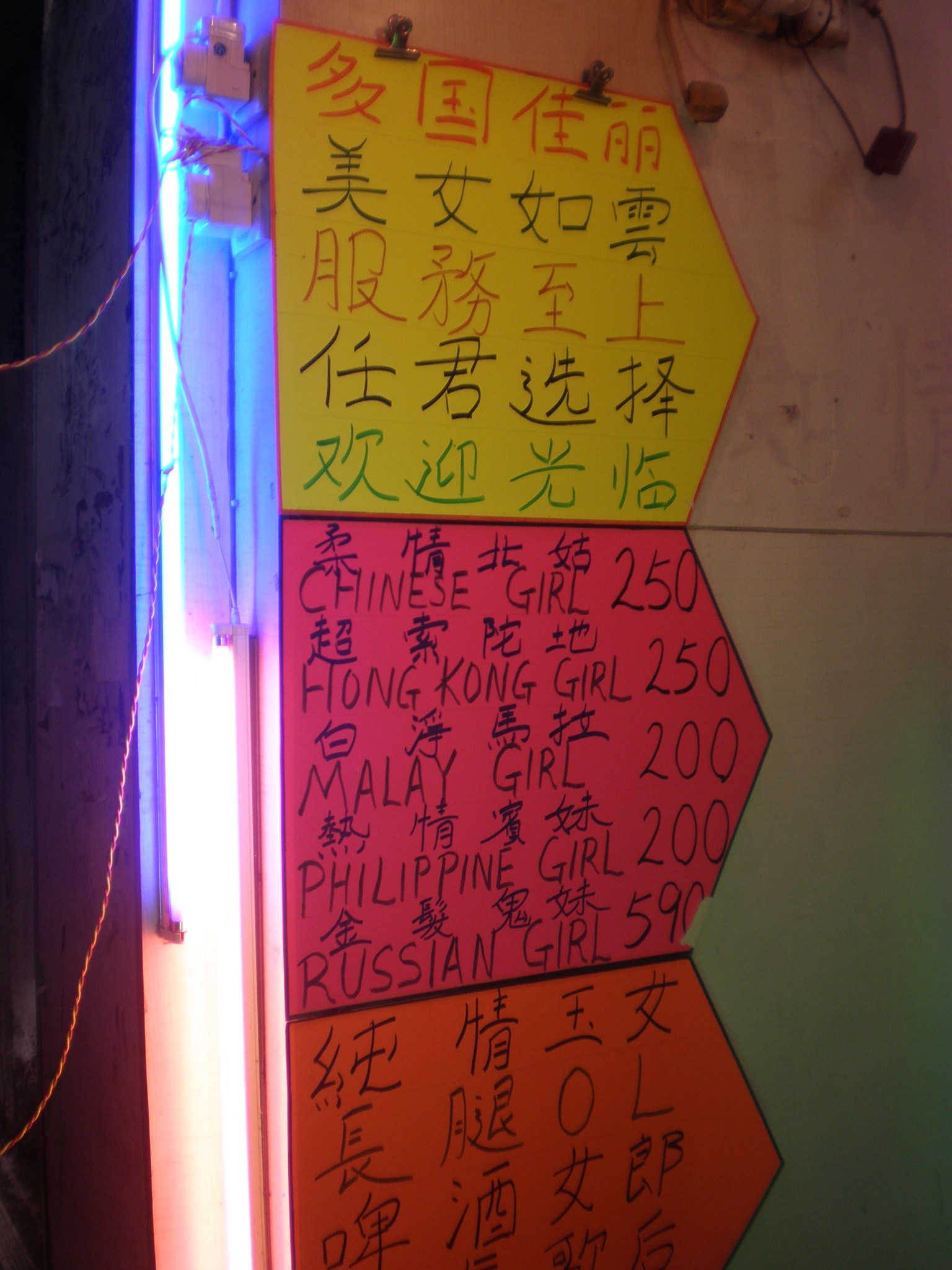
A sign advertising different prices for various nationalities of women outside a brothel in Hong Kong

Concepts of race and sexuality have interacted in various ways in different historical contexts. While partially based on physical similarities within groups, race is understood by scientists to be a social construct rather than a biological reality. Human sexuality involves biological, erotic, physical, emotional, social, or spiritual feelings and behaviors.

United States law has a complex history regarding race and sexuality. In the 1800s, resistance to mixing between Blacks and whites led to the passage of laws banning their intermarriage. At the same time, a fear of Asian women's sexual appeal led to the complete ban of Chinese prostitutes from migrating to the United States, as it was believed that they would seduce married White men.

Studies of online dating and physical attractiveness have indicated that race may be "gendered", as it was repeatedly found that East and Southeast Asian women were considered more attractive than other groups of women. Gendered racial stereotypes exist within the LGBT community, which have been described as both alienating and empowering.

Race has historically been a factor in sexual fetishism, with the Asian fetish, a preference for women of Asian descent, and the fetishization of Black men being prominent examples.

== Attitudes towards interracial relationships ==
=== In the United States before the Civil Rights Era ===
After the abolition of slavery in 1865, white Americans showed an increasing resistance towards racial mixing. The remnants of the racial divide became stronger post-slavery as the concept of whiteness developed. There was a widely held belief that uncontrollable lust threatens the purity of the nation. This increased white anxiety about interracial sex, and has been described through Montesquieu's climatic theory in his book The Spirit of the Laws, which explains how people from different climates have different temperaments, "The inhabitants of warm countries are, like old men, timorous; the people in cold countries are, like young men, brave." At the time, Black women held the "Jezebel" stereotype, which claimed Black women often initiated sex outside of marriage and were generally sexually promiscuous. This idea stemmed from the first encounters between European men and African women. As the men were not used to the extremely hot climate, they misinterpreted the women's lack of clothing for vulgarity.

After the opening of Japan by Matthew Perry, word began to spread in the United States about the seductive femininity of Asian women. A fear that Asian women would seduce White men and destroy White families led to the passage Page Act of 1875, which prevented Chinese women from entering the United States.

There are a few potential reasons as to why such strong ideas on interracial sex developed. The Reconstruction Era which followed the Civil War started to disassemble traditional aspects of Southern society. Now, the Southerners who were used to being dominant were no longer legally allowed to run their farms by practicing slavery. The Southern Democrats were not pleased with the outcome of this reformation. This radical reconstruction of the South was deeply unpopular and it slowly unraveled, leading to the introduction of Jim Crow laws, which legally discriminated against African Americans, There was an increase in the sense of white dominance and sexual racism among the Southern people, Tensions heightened after the end of the civil war in 1865, and as a result, the sexual anxiety which existed in the white population intensified. The Ku Klux Klan was formed in 1867, an event which triggered violence and terrorism which targeted the Black population. When Jim Crow laws were eventually overturned, it took years for the court to resolve the numerous acts of discrimination.

Allegations of sexual harassment were often used as justification for the lynching of African Americans. Emmett Till was an African American teenager who was lynched by two white men. Till was lynched because his assailants believed that he had whistled at a white woman, but in actuality, he had whistled for his own reasons.

=== Challenges to attitudes ===
After World War 2, a large number of Asian women (especially Japanese) were married to US servicemen. Marriages to Asian women initially faced legal obstacles due to pre-existing laws against interracial marriage. However, the determination of American servicemen to marry Japanese women resulted in widespread defiance of the law. The high reputation of Japanese war brides generated sympathy from the general public about the difficulties faced by interracial couples, leading to increased tolerance for interracial marriage. In 1947, the War Brides Act was amended to give citizenship to the children of American servicemen regardless of race or ethnicity. Ultimately the effort to normalize interracial marriages involving Japanese women led to the passage of the McCarran-Walter act, which repealed the Immigration Act of 1924, thereby loosening restrictions on immigration and citizenship requirements for non-Northwestern European immigrants.

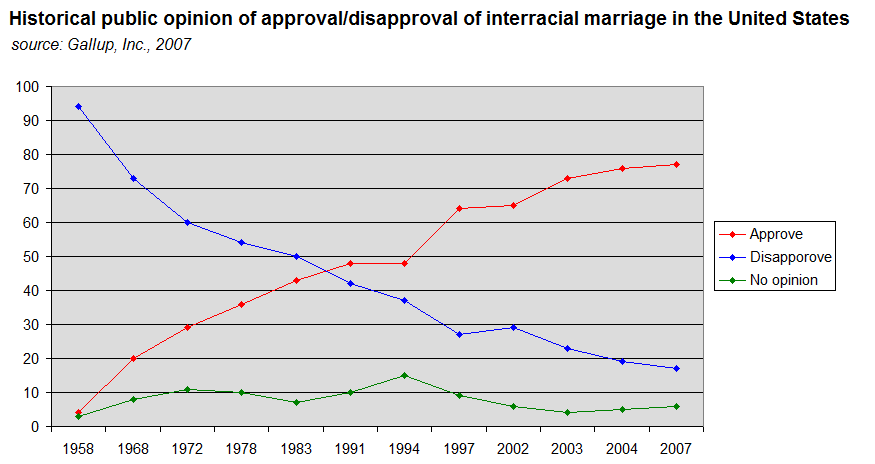
Graph indicating the extent to which US citizens agree or disagree with interracial marriage, spanning 1958–2007

The prevalence of interracial couples may demonstrate how attitudes have changed in the last 50 years. A case that received heightened publicity is that of Mildred and Richard Loving. The couple lived in Virginia yet had to marry outside the state due to the anti-miscegenation laws present in nearly half of the US states in 1958. Once married, the pair returned to Virginia, and were both arrested in their home for the infringement of the Racial Integrity Act, and each sentenced to a year in prison, a sentence which was ultimately overturned by the United States Supreme Court.

== Racial preferences ==
=== Heterosexual community ===
==== Online dating ====
Race affects how likely a person is to receive responses on online dating websites, however this varies greatly by gender and race. Research has indicated a progressive acceptance of interracial relationships by white individuals. The majority of white Americans are not against interracial relationships and marriage, though these beliefs do not imply that the person in question will pursue an interracial marriage themselves. In 2007, fewer than 5% of white Americans wed outside their own race; however this does not imply that whites are less likely to enter interracial relationships, because the larger size of the white population (relative to Asian or African-Americans) means that intermarriages do not make as large of an impact on white marriage rates as they do on non-white marriage rates. By 2017, the rate of outmarriage among whites had doubled to 11%.

In 2021, the University of California published a comprehensive analysis of online dating trends in the United States. The authors posit that the rise of online dating has exacerbated underlying racial biases in dating.

The data from this research show that heterosexual White men are more likely to be messaged by Black, Asian, and Hispanic women than men who match their race; yet when men respond to women, White women do not have the same advantage. The authors attribute this difference to socioeconomic status being important to women, and physical attractiveness more important to men. Same-race preference is more common among White people than non-White people, regardless of gender or sexual orientation.

The authors show that Black daters and especially Black women are especially disadvantaged in online dating. They also show that straight White women and gay White men are less likely to message Asian men compared to their own race, but Black and Latina women are equally likely.

In most countries, certain racial groups are often perceived as more physically attractive than others, and this often varies by gender. Black women and Asian men are among the least desired demographics in heterosexual online dating, with their opposite gender counterparts being more likely to date interracially. In the United States, several studies have found that East Asian women are the most desired group of women, while East Asian men are less desired. Some view this to be the result of the hypersexualization of Asian women in popular media, while other studies attribute the higher rate of interracial marriages to a simple preference for the physical features of Asian women.

A 2009 study analyzed online dating trends among white men and white women. The authors found that Black and Asian men faced high rates of exclusion from white women, while white men were more likely than white women to exclude Blacks, but were otherwise more willing to date interracially.

Yancey, et al. (2009) report African American preferences: the most preferred partner belonged to the Hispanic group (61%), followed by white individuals (59.6%) and then Asian Americans (43.5%). Both Hispanic and Asian Americans prefer to date a white individual (80.3% and 87.3%, respectively), and both are least willing to date African Americans (56.5% and 69.5%). In all significant cases, Hispanic Americans are preferred to Asian Americans, and Asian Americans are significantly preferred over African Americans. Hispanic Americans are less likely to be excluded in online dating partner preferences by whites seeking a partner, as Latinos are often viewed as an ethnic group that is increasingly assimilating more into white American culture.

Asian men and Black women face more obstacles to acceptance online than their opposite sex counterparts. According to Kao, et al., the dating disadvantage of Asian men persisted even when they had advanced educational backgrounds and significantly higher incomes. Increased education does however influence choices in the other direction, such that a higher level of schooling is associated with more optimistic feelings towards interracial relationships. White men are most likely to exclude Black women, as opposed to women of another race. A 2009 study found that a subset of white male online daters were open to dating women of all races except Black women.

High levels of previous exposure to a variety of racial groups is correlated with decreased racial preferences. Racial preferences in dating are also influenced by the area of residence. Those residing in the south-eastern regions in American states are less likely to have been in an interracial relationship and are less likely to interracially date in the future. People who engaged in regular religious customs at age 12 are also less likely to interracially date. Moreover, those from a Jewish background are significantly more likely to enter an interracial relationship than those from a Protestant background.

A 2015 study of interracial online dating within multiple European countries, analyzing the dating preferences of Europeans, Africans, Asians (including South Asians) and Hispanics, found that most races ranked Europeans as most preferred, followed by Hispanics and Asians as intermediately preferable, and finally Africans as the least preferred. Country-specific results were more variable, with more diverse countries showing more openness to engage in interracial dating. The researchers noted that Arabs tended to have higher same-race preferences in regions with higher Arabic populations, possibly due to more traditional cultural norms on marriage.

Currently, there are websites that target specific demographic preferences, such that singles can sign up online and focus on one particular partner quality, such as race, religious beliefs or ethnicity. In addition to this, there are online dating services that target race-specific partner choices, and a selection of pages dedicated to interracial dating that allow users to select partners based on age, gender and particularly race. Online dating services experience controversy in this context, as debate is cast over whether statements such as "no Asians" or "not attracted to Asians" in user profiles are racist or merely signify individual preferences.

Non-white ethnic minorities, mostly Indians and East Asians, who feel they lack dating prospects as a result of their race, sometimes refer to themselves as ricecels, currycels, or more broadly ethnicels, a term related to incel. Racial preferences are sometimes considered a subset of lookism.

=== LGBT community ===
Hoang Tan Nguyen, an assistant professor of English and Film Studies at Bryn Mawr College, wrote that Asian men are often feminized and desexualized by both mainstream and LGBT media. The gay Asian-Canadian author Richard Fung has opined that he believes that while Black men are portrayed as hypersexualized, gay Asian men are portrayed as being feminine. According to Fung, gay Asian men tend to ignore or display displeasure with races such as Blacks, and other Asians but seemingly give sexual acceptance and approval to gay white men.

Within the transgender community and those attracted to trans women, women of East Asian descent are highly sought after, because of the racial stereotype that Asian women's features are 'prettier' than those of white women. According to Chong-suk Han, this explains why East Asian drag queens typically win trans beauty pageants, because they are thought to pass more easily as female. Charlie Anders notes that the best-selling transsexual pornographic films depict Asian trans women, and they are highly esteemed and sought after by men identifying as heterosexual.

Asian American women have reported a sense of invisibility in lesbian, gay, bisexual (LGB) communities. According to a 2015 study, Asian American participants who identified as lesbian or bisexual often reported stereotyping, and fetishism in LGB circles and the larger U.S. culture, as well as low representation within the community, as minorities.

In German gay male subculture, discriminatory attitudes have been reported, particularly towards obese or overweight men, feminine men, and Asian men.

Racial preferences are also prevalent in gay online dating in the United States. Phua and Kaufman (2003) noted that men seeking men online were more likely than men seeking women to look at racial traits. According to one study, LGBTQ+ people are significantly more likely to be in interracial relationships than heterosexual people.

In a qualitative study conducted by Paul, Ayala, and Choi (2010) with Asian and Pacific Islanders (API), Latino, and African American men seeking men, participants interviewed said that racial preference was a common criterion in online dating partner selection. According to a study using a large sample size of gay men in Australia, there is widespread tolerance of sexual racism in that country.

== Racial bias ==
A 2015 study on sexual racism among gay and bisexual men found a strong correlation between test subjects' racist attitudes and their stated racial preferences.

In her 2018 essay "Does anyone have the right to sex?" philosopher Amia Srinivasan argued that Western beauty standards have racialized origins, and she stated that racial bias can shape sexual desire.

== Racial fetishism ==
Racial fetishism is sexually fetishizing a person or culture belonging to a specific race or ethnic group.

=== Theories ===
Homi K. Bhabha explains racial fetishism as a form of racist stereotyping, which is woven into colonial discourse and based on multiple/contradictory and splitting beliefs, similar to the disavowal which Sigmund Freud discusses. Bhabha defines colonial discourse as that which activates the simultaneous "recognition and disavowal of racial/cultural/historical differences" and whose goal is to define the colonized as 'other', but also as fixed and knowable stereotypes. Racial fetishism involves contradictory belief systems where the 'other' is both demonized and idolized.

The effects of racial fetishism as a form of sexual racism among gay men of color are discussed in research conducted by Mary Plummer. Plummer found that gay clubs and bars, casual sex encounters as well as romantic relationships frequently presented psychologically distressing situations for non-white gay men. These include lowered self-esteem, internalized sexual racism, and increased psychological distress in gay men of color, such as being expected to embody Asian racial stereotypes or to have stereotypically Asian racial characteristics, such as "smooth skin".

Fetishism can take multiple forms and has branched off to incorporate different races. The theories of naturalist Darwin can offer some observations in regards to why some people might find other races more attractive than their own. Attraction can be viewed as a mechanism for choosing a healthy mate. People's minds have evolved to recognize aspects of other peoples' biology that makes them an appropriate or good mate. This area of theory is called optimal outbreeding hypothesis.

=== Examples ===
==== White women ====
Rey Chow in 1991 argued that the fetishism of white women in Chinese media has nothing to do with sex. Chow describes it as a type of commodity fetishism. White women, according to Chow, are seen as a representation of what China does not have: an image of a woman as something more than the heterosexual opposite to man.

Perry Johansson in 1999 argued that following the globalization of China, the perception of Westerners changed drastically. With the Opening of China to the outside world, representations of Westerners shifted from enemies of China to individuals of great power, money, and sophistication. Chinese advertisements depict Western women as symbols of strength. The body language of Chinese models in ads expresses shyness and docility, while the body language of Western women demonstrates power and unashamedness. The study suggested White women are even presented with qualities otherwise considered to be "masculine" in Chinese culture.

According to a 2014 study of Swedish women in Singapore, white women are not fetishized in East Asia, but placed beneath Asian women in the beauty hierarchy. European racial characteristics such as blond hair desexualized Swedish women in Singapore, and made them feel less feminine. Furthermore, their Swedish husbands found local Taiwanese women highly attractive, contributing to the low self esteem of the Swedish women.

According to Erica Lorraine Williams, White women in Brazil are considered less attractive than women of color. White Brazilian women have complained that foreign male sex tourists are not interested in them, and that these men prefer nonwhite women over White Brazilian women. For this reason, White Brazilian women struggle to compete for the money of male sex tourists.

==== Asian women ====
Several studies have shown that East Asian women are ranked as the most desired women in dating. Research has found that Asian women are considered the most desirable because Asian women's physical features are perceived as more feminine, and therefore more attractive than white women's.

An Asian fetish focusing on East Asian, Southeast Asian and to an extent South Asian women has been documented in Australasia, North America, and Scandinavia amongst groups of white men.

According to a 2008 article from the Washington and Lee Journal of Civil Rights and Social Justice by Sunny Woan, the modern "Asian fetish" originates from Western imperialism. Western men deployed overseas found Asian women physically attractive, innocent, and sexually superior to white women. These stereotypes became widespread when Western men returned to their home countries, and may be linked to the over-representation of Asian women in pornography, as well as the mail-order bride phenomenon.

==== Middle Eastern and North African women ====
According to multiple articles, the West's fetishization of fully covered Arab women has led to the stereotype that Arab women and women from the Muslim world are oppressed and therefore submissive. When French armies invaded Algeria, Algerian women appeared to have been more modestly dressed and covered from their head to toes. Many French photographers tried to pay Algerian women to remove part of their religious attire and pose for photos to make French postcards. Joseph Massad talks about how the West's interpretation of Arab culture has painted the stereotype of Arab women being exotic and desirable. Massad's book was largely influenced by Edward Said's book Orientalism.

==== Latin American women ====
In her book Sex Tourism in Bahia Ambiguous Entanglements, Erica Lorraine Williams published the first full-length ethnography of sex tourism in Brazil, including interviews with tourists who come solely to participate in sexual tourism, which may be considered a form of racialized fetishism. One of the tourists interviewed described his experience, "I've had a thing for Latin, brown-skinned women since my early twenties. I'm from [a place] where there are a lot of blonde, white girls. Whatever you have, you like the opposite – they're exotic, intriguing."

==== Black women ====
The fetishization of Black women expanded during the Colonial Era, as white male slave owners raped and sexually abused their Black, female slaves. They justified their actions by labeling the women as hyper-sexual property. These labels solidified into what is commonly referred to as the "Jezebel" stereotype. The opposite of this "Jezebel" identity or persona is the "Mammy" figure who loses all of her sexual agency and autonomy, and becomes an asexual figure. L. H. Stallings notes that the creation and identities for the Jezebel or Mammy figures are "dependent upon patriarchy and heterosexuality." An example of racial fetishism within the colonial era is that of Sarah Baartman. Baartman's body was utilized as a means to develop an anatomically accurate representation of a Black woman's body juxtaposed to that of a white European woman's body during the age of biological racism. The scientist studying her anatomy went as far as making a mold of Baartman's genitalia postmortem because she refused him access to examine her vaginal region while she was alive. The data collected on Baartman is the origin of the Black female body stereotype, i.e. large buttocks and labia.

Charmaine Nelson suggests that every nude painting feeds into the voyeuristic male gaze, but the way Black women are painted has even more undertones. "The Black female body defies the white male subject's desire for a single subject of 'pure' origin in two ways: firstly, through a sexual 'otherness' as woman, and secondly through a racial and color 'otherness' as Black. It is the combined power of these two markers of social location that has enabled western artists to represent Black women at the margins of societal boundaries of propriety." Nelson asserts that any Black woman is considered a fetish in these paintings and that she is only viewed in a sexual lens.

One of the more recent popular discourses around the fetishization of Black women surrounds the release of Nicki Minaj's popular song, "Anaconda" in 2014. The entire song and music video revolves around the largeness of Black women's bottoms. While some praise Minaj's work for its embrace of female sexuality, some criticized that this song continues to reduce Black women to be the focus of the male gaze. The 2020 song "WAP" ("Wet-Ass Pussy") by Cardi B and Megan Thee Stallion received a similar mixed reception, with some outlets praising its embrace of Black female sexuality and others claiming it was degrading or objectifying women of color.

==== Black men ====
"Big Black cock", usually shortened to "BBC", is a sexual slang and genre of ethnic pornography, that focuses on Black men with large penises. The stereotype of larger penis size in Black men has been subjected to scientific scrutiny. There is no scientific background to support the alleged 'oversized' penis in Black people.

In a 2009 study, a small subset of white female online daters were found to exclusively prefer only Black men. White women were found to be 7 times more likely than white men to have an exclusive preference for Blacks, while they were 11 times more likely than white men to reject Asians as partners. White women who described their body type as "thick, voluptuous, a few extra pounds, or large" were more likely to prefer only Black men, and white women with slimmer body types were 7 times more likely to exclude them. White women with a height preference were more likely to exclude Asian men and over 8 times as likely to prefer only Black men, possibly suggesting that Black men are desired because they are perceived as possessing more physically masculine traits such as a tall stature. The authors suggested that White men may be more likely to prefer Asian women due to stereotypes that they embody "perfect womanhood and exotic femininity". Follow-up studies by Feliciano et al. have largely replicated these results.

In a 2012 study where 20 women were polled, Black men's faces were shown to be perceived as more attractive than White or East Asian males. In dating apps, however, white female online daters, as well as other female online daters from other races, generally possess a preference for white men.

The word "Jomok", a portmanteau of the words joke and homok (Indonesian slang for homosexual), was coined as a term referring to an Indonesian internet subculture that emerged in 2023 and is characterized by the generation of online content using gay pornography videos featuring Black men presented in recontextualized situations that audiences may perceive to be humorous. An article published by the Center for Digital Society criticized this culture as a "pattern of over-sexualization and digital shaming" that promotes homophobia and racism by degrading and ridiculing stereotypes of Black men to make audiences feel superior over the minorities featured in the videos.

==== Jewish women ====
In the Middle Ages, a literary trope emerged of Jewish women seducing Christian men. Stories of medieval rulers having affairs with Jewish women became used to explain how various kingships related Jews and Judaism. Jewish women as a love interest for Christian men became popular in 19th century Western European literature, and became known as La Belle Juive. The trope frequently depicted Jewish women as hypersexual. A contemporary version of the trope characterizes Jewish women as masculine and having large sexual appetites. Modern media often merges this characterization of Jewish women with the Jewish American Princess stereotype.

==== In BDSM ====
There is also a practice in BDSM that involves fetishizing race called "raceplay". Susanne Schotanus defined raceplay as "a sexual practice where the either imagined or real racial background of one or more of the participants is used to create this power-imbalance in a BDSM-scene, through the use of slurs, narratives and objects laden with racial history." Feminist author Audre Lorde cautions that this kind of BDSM "operates in tandem with social, cultural, economic, and political patterns of domination and submission" creating the perpetuation of negative stereotypes for Black women in particular.

However, race play can also be used within BDSM as a curative practice for Black individuals to take back their autonomy from a history of subjugation. One BDSM Dominatrix explains that raceplay provides her with an "emotional sense of reparations". Ariane Cruz writes that "Violence for Black female performers in BDSM becomes not just a vehicle of intense pleasure but also a mode of accessing and critiquing power." These racialized BDSM performances are politically significant in terms of Black women's sexual representation.

== See also ==
- Afrophobia
- Anti-miscegenation laws
- Discrimination based on skin color
- Discrimination in the United States
- Ethnic pornography
- Gendered racism
- Interracial marriage
- Race and crime
- Racism against African Americans
- Racism in the United States
- Sexual capital § Race
- Sexual objectification
- Stereotypes of African Americans
- Stereotypes of groups within the United States

== Bibliography ==
- Gross, Larry P.; Woods, James D., eds. (1999). The Columbia Reader on Lesbians and Gay Men in Media, Society, and Politics. Between Men—Between Women. New York: Columbia University Press. ISBN 978-0-231-10446-3.
- Marubbio, M. Elise (2006). Killing the Indian Maiden: Images of Native American Women in Film. Lexington: University Press of Kentucky. ISBN 978-0-8131-2414-8.
- Nguyen, Hoang Tan (2004). "The Resurrection of Brandon Lee: The Making of a Gay Asian American Porn Star". In Williams, Linda (ed.). Porn Studies. Durham, North Carolina: Duke University Press. pp. 223–270. ISBN 978-0-8223-3300-5.
- ——— (2014). A View from the Bottom: Asian American Masculinity and Sexual Representation. Perverse Modernities. Durham: Duke University Press. ISBN 978-0-8223-5684-4.
- Williams, Apryl (2024). Not My Type: Automating Sexual Racism in Online Dating. Stanford: Stanford University Press. ISBN 978-1-5036-3504-3.
