= Black Buck =

American racial slur

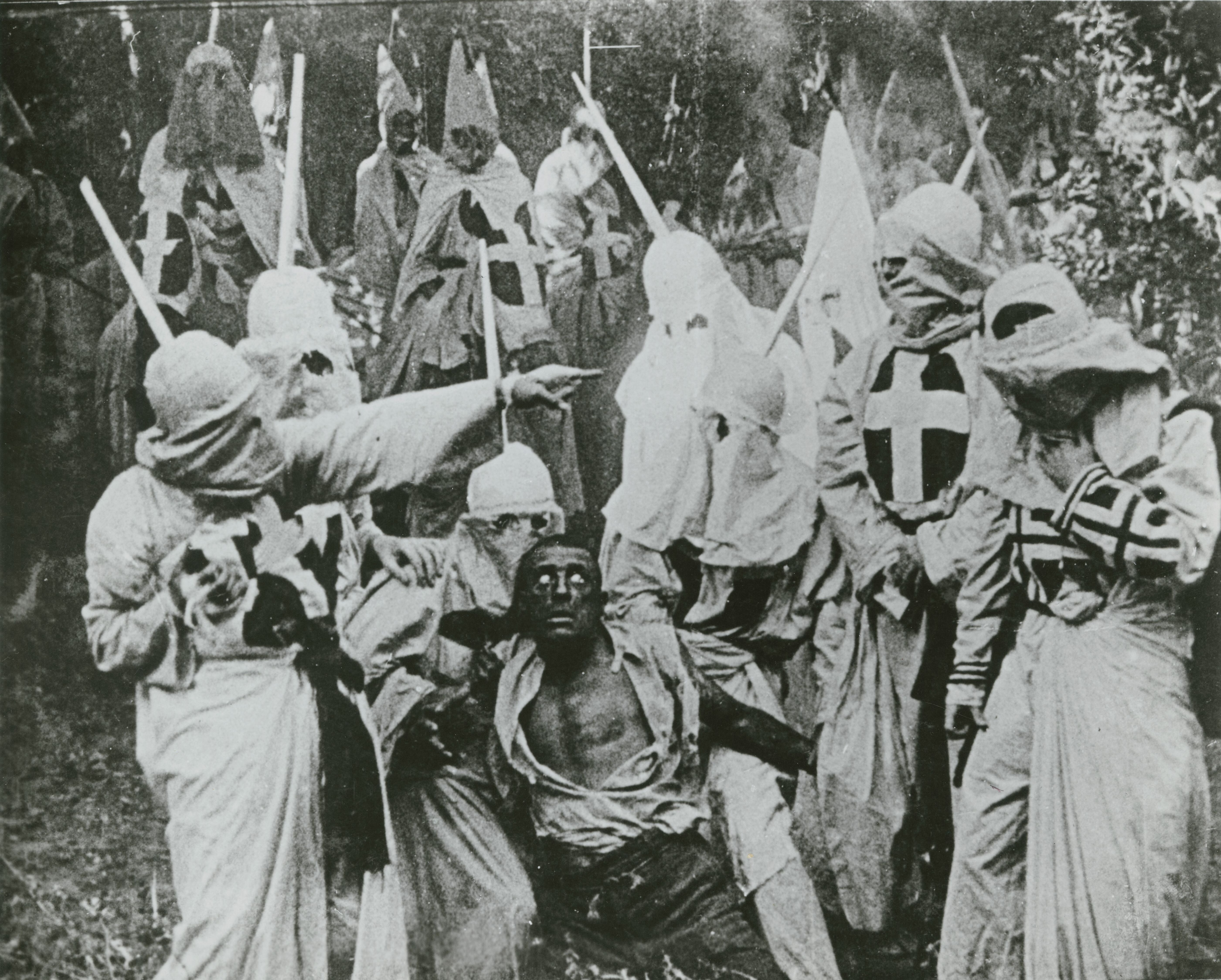
The character Gus (portrayed in blackface by white actor Walter Long), a black buck, is captured by Klansmen in The Birth of a Nation (1915)

Black Buck, also known as Big Black Buck (not to be confused with big black cock or BBC), is a stereotype of a black American male: large, violent, and voraciously attracted to white women. It is closely related to the black American stereotypes of the black brute and the mandingo.

According to the National Museum of African American History and Culture, the stereotype originated as European Americans feared freed black American males would exact revenge for slavery against white men by raping their daughters, wives, mothers or grandmothers while Riché Richardson says it was created at the end of the 19th century to justify Lynching in the United States.

The stereotype has been depicted in films to reflect negatively on black Americans such as The Birth of a Nation (1915) and to reflect positively such as Sweet Sweetback's Baadasssss Song (1971), although it has been challenged by some in the black American community as to whether these depictions are good.

== Characteristics ==
An African American male stereotyped as a black buck is large, violent, and attracted to white women in a hypersexual manner; historian Donald Bogle describes these as "big, baadddd niggers".

In depicting an African American male sexually attracted to white women, Bogle writes that these women are given symbolic value, of "white pride, power, and beauty". In the stereotype, the buck's strength makes him to a white audience at once "superhuman" and inhuman.

Vanessa Corredera writes that the stereotype persists in contemporary understandings of African American men as hypersexual, as written about by bell hooks in We Real Cool: Black Men and Masculinity.

=== Relationship to the Black Brute ===
Bogle identifies the black buck as a subdivision of the Brutish Black Buck character type. The Brutish Black Buck, according to Bogle, is one of several classic African American character types in media, alongside others including the tragic mulatto and mammy. Alongside the black buck, Brutish Black Buck is divided into black brutes, with the two subgroups closely related. For Bogle, the black brutes are anonymous, animalistic and criminal African American figures who exercise black rage, unleashing destruction. His violence was understood to derive from "sexual repression." Black Bucks, by contrast, are distinguished by their sexual assertiveness and as being more individualized, including in the danger they pose. Corredera describes the black buck as a term used to emphasize the lustful character of the Black Brute, although she also characterizes them as distinct.

== Origin ==
In an article published by the National Museum of African American History and Culture, the black buck stereotype is said to have arisen from the earlier Mandingo stereotype. This was a concept promoted by actors in the slave trade, who invoked images of strong, young black men who could be forced to submit to their owners to undertake labor. As African Americans were emancipated, fears were borne among the white population that these African American males would exact revenge against white men by having sex with their daughters. According to Riché Richardson, the stereotype originated in the late 19th century as a justification for lynching, to supplant the dominant understanding of African American males as docile figures, seen in the stereotype of Uncle Tom.

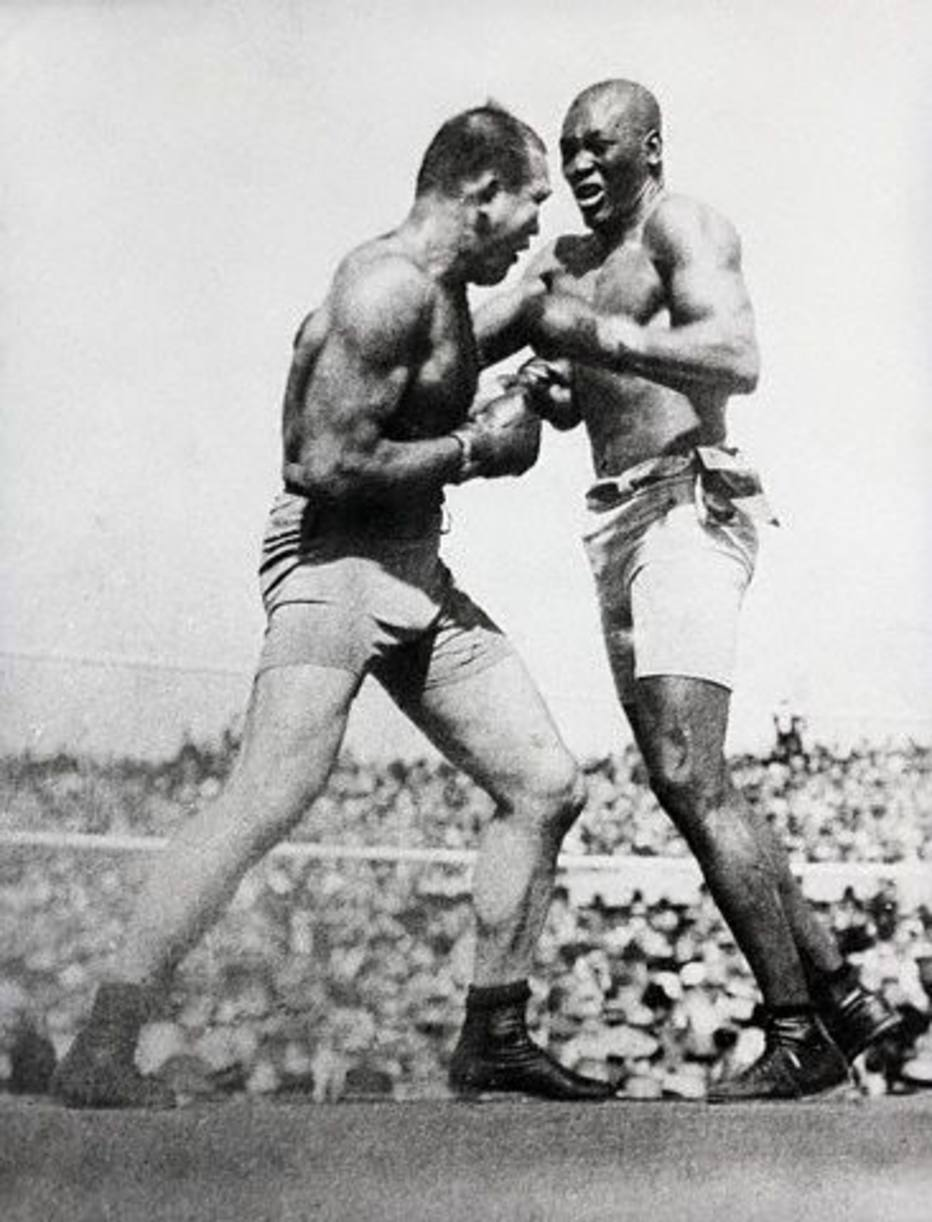
Jack Johnson vs. James J. Jeffries (1910)

In the beginning of the 20th century, newspapers featured many stories of African males described as fitting the description of a black buck arrested, murdered, and attempted to be lynched. Boxer Jack Johnson was a figure seen to epitomize the stereotype, particularly through his relationships with white women, which were subject to significant media attention. When he won a 1910 fight against James J. Jeffries, who had been billed as the "Great White Hope", race riots ensued across America.

== In film ==
D.W. Griffith's 1915 motion picture The Birth of a Nation is perhaps one of the best known examples of the use of the black buck stereotype in the media, seen in the characters of Silas Lynch and Gus. In the film, these characters pursue white women, with an apparent intent to rape and kidnap, driven by what is depicted as an apparent "animalistic" lust. Through the stereotype's depiction in The Birth of a Nation, perceptions of African American males as preying on white women increased in popularity.

In 1971, Melvin Van Peebles' blaxploitation thriller Sweet Sweetback's Baadasssss Song was released. This was the first depiction on film of African American men confidently expressing their sexuality since the early 20th century, even as precursors such as the late 1960s films of Jim Brown existed. Bogle writes that the film's provocative depiction of an African American masculinity may be read to have "fed white hysteria and paranoia," albeit unapologetically, and sociologist David Pilgrim writes that the film's depiction of black masculinity is better understood as showcasing the black brute stereotype. Following Sweet Sweetback's Baadasssss Song throughout the early 1970s, a string of films featuring positive depictions of the buck were released. These films updated the stereotype for a new time, making the figure cool and somewhat political and received strong support within the African American community, although some opposition to the use of the buck trope was voiced. Bogle credits the films with influencing major pictures such as Taxi Driver and Rocky.

Later characters in films, such as Nino, the lead of New Jack City (1991) and Jules in Pulp Fiction (1994) continued to feature elements of the black buck stereotype, although this was balanced or sidestepped by giving the character a keen intelligence in the case of Nino or moral complexity and witty dialogue in the case of Jules. During the 1990s, the stereotype was again updated as it was seen in "pro-gangster" movies, sometimes portrayed by rappers. Characters in the 2000s continued to be identified as containing elements of the black buck, such as Denzel Washington's character in Training Day (2001) and in characters in American Gangster (2007).

== Use by white supremacists ==
David Duke, former Grand Wizard of the Ku Klux Klan, was quoted in The Sun newspaper of Wichita, Kansas (23 April 1975) as saying, "White people don't need a law against rape, but if you fill this room up with your normal black bucks, you would, because niggers are basically primitive animals."

The perpetrator of the 2022 Buffalo shooting had the phrase “Buck Status: Broken” hand-painted in one of his rifles.

== See also ==
- Angry black woman
- Stereotypes of African Americans
- African-American representation in Hollywood
- Jim Crow Museum of Racist Memorabilia
- Racial profiling
- Stereotypes of groups within the United States
- Scientific racism
- BBC (sexual slang)
