= Soraya Santiago Solla =

Puerto Rican transgender pioneer (1947–2020)

- Born: December 6, 1947; San Juan Puerto Rico
- Died: September 22, 2020 (aged 72); Carolina, Puerto Rico

Bárbara "Soraya" Santiago Solla (December 6, 1947 – September 22, 2020) was a pioneer of the transgender community in Puerto Rico as well as the first person in Puerto Rico to change the gender designation on their birth certificate following gender reassignment surgery.

A native of Puerto Rico, Santiago had gender reassignment surgery in 1975 at the age of 28 while living in New York City. Upon returning to Puerto Rico in 1976, she successfully petitioned to change the gender listed on her birth certificate.

Her memoir, Hecha a mano : disforia de género (Hand Made: Gender Dysphoria), was published in 2014. During the same year, Santiago was featured in the documentary, Mala Mala, which was nominated for awards by GLAAD and the Tribeca Film Institute and won numerous others.

== Early life ==
Santiago was born on December 6, 1947, in San Juan, Puerto Rico, to Alicia Solla, a local hotel housekeeper, and Ramón Santiago Berrios, an official for a Puerto Rican tax agency. Santiago grew up alongside one sister, Carmen Santiago Solla. In her memoir, Santiago recalls that, from an early age, her parents were attuned to her effeminate mannerisms, resulting in physical abuse and frequent immersion in conventionally masculine activities, including attending boxing matches with her father.

In her later teenage years, citing irreconcilable differences with her family, Santiago departed to New York City, where she stayed for over 10 years. There, Santiago met and befriended numerous members of the LGBTQ community, many of whom also belonged to the million-member Puerto Rican diaspora that had relocated to New York City following the Second World War. This mid-century mass migration from the commonwealth to the mainland was due largely to the worsening Puerto Rican economy as well as the rapid expansion of the Luis Muñoz Marín International Airport, the latter of which made contiguous migration much more attractive to young Puerto Ricans. In New York City, many queer Puerto Ricans, including Santiago, were frequent patrons of the Stonewall Inn in Greenwich Village for years prior to the notorious Stonewall riots of 1969, when LGBTQ patrons throughout the neighborhood fought back against violent police raids in an event now considered to be a major catalyst for the U.S. gay liberation movement.

== Transition and return to Puerto Rico ==
In the 1950s, Bronx-native Christine Jorgensen dominated public attention when she traveled to Europe in order to find a surgeon willing to provide gender reassignment surgery as well as hormonal treatment. The later-actress and activist rose to fame in large part due to her background as a U.S. serviceman during World War II, a contrast which challenged the masculinity that had come to define the post-war U.S. (as demonstrated in the New York Daily News' front-page story, "Ex-GI Becomes Blonde Beauty"), and which emboldened other transgender women to pursue their own surgeries and treatments. As the gender reassignment industry expanded overseas, American universities and colleges began to heavily invest in studies related to sex changes. By the 1970s, over 40 gender clinics could be found in universities across the country.

After receiving $3,000 from her mother in 1975, Santiago followed the lead of Jorgensen and other trans women in New York City, undergoing gender reassignment surgery at a local clinic after receiving approval from both the federal and Puerto Rican governments. A year following the procedure, Santiago returned to Puerto Rico and settled in Carolina, where she petitioned in court to legally change both her first name to Bárbara and the gender on her birth certificate to female. During the court case, a gynecologist testified that Santiago had female genitalia, leading to the success of the petition and Santiago's subsequent fame across the island as the first Puerto Rican to publicly acknowledge having undergone gender reassignment surgery.

Also in 1976, Santiago set up a later-famous hair salon in Carolina called Soraya Hair Design. At this hair salon, Santiago consorted with politically-influential upper-class women for decades until after the 2008 financial crisis — and its later role in the 2014 Puerto Rican government-debt crisis — rendered the salon's operation unsustainable.

In 1986, Santiago utilized her new legal gender designation to marry Héctor Mejía Santana, a man from the Dominican Republic, and appeal for his immigration to Puerto Rico. Although Puerto Rican officials initially resisted accepting the appeal due to Santiago's previous legal status as male (compounded with Puerto Rico's ban on same-sex marriages), Secretary of Justice Héctor Rivera Cruz ultimately permitted Santana's immigration, deeming the conjugal union as legal due to Santiago's birth certificate.

In Santiago's memoir, she mentions the adoption of a son, Eddie, whom Santiago trained to become a hairdresser alongside her.

During the 2008 U.S. elections, Santiago ran for a seat on the Municipal Assembly in Carolina as the pro-statehood New Progressive Party candidate. Although she ultimately lost the election, Santiago once again made history for being the first trans Puerto Rican to run for any public office.

== Views on trans identity ==
Although Santiago is remembered as a source of inspiration for the Puerto Rican trans community, she did not herself ascribe to the identity of transsexual. In an interview for Mala Mala — the 2014 documentary which featured other members of the Puerto Rican transgender community, including RuPaul's Drag Race star April Carrión — Santiago clarified her identity as a heterosexual woman who had corrected her gender dysphoria, pointing to the documentation which she had acquired in 1976 asserting her legal identity as a woman.

In the documentary, Santiago claimed that transgender women who had not undergone surgery were not legitimate women due to their lack of commitment to the permanent aspects of gender reassignment, and were instead superficial "beauty queens." Furthermore, in an interview with Remezcla in 2015, Santiago asserted that her "forty years of womanhood" had not begun until the completion of her gender reassignment surgery in New York City.

Santiago maintained these two notions throughout her life — that transsexuality was an offensive and inaccurate label, and that surgery was necessary for a different gender identity — putting her in stark contrast with younger members of the trans community, including Ivana Fred, a Puerto Rican transgender activist who was featured in conversation with Santiago in Mala Mala. Unlike Santiago, Fred moved for a more inclusive view of gender identity, which considered the personal and financial motivations for opting out of surgical procedures. Furthermore, Fred considered the distinction between transgender and cisgender individuals to be crucial to understanding the unique inequality that the trans community of Puerto Rico has historically faced.

In these ways, Santiago and Fred's differences represent a generational divide within the feminist community (specifically between second-wave and third-wave feminists) concerning belonging and the legitimacy of gender identity. Many older cisgender feminists — such as journalist Elinor Burkett, who wrote "What Makes a Woman?" for The New York Times — have been denounced for diminishing trans women's experiences on the basis of genitalia, garnering the label of trans-exclusionary radical feminists from others in the community. Similarly, author and professor Janice Raymond elicited controversy in the 1970s for accusing transsexual women of exploiting the female form and worsening gender oppression through conforming to the binary. On the other hand, younger cisgender Black feminists, including Brittney Cooper of the Crunk Feminist Collective, have espoused the distinction between cisgender and transgender bodies in an effort to highlight the unique reproductive violence that has been committed against Black female bodies since the era of American slavery, while also avoiding the minimization of the particular and often deadly violence that Black transgender women face. Although Burkett and Raymond reject any possibility of a commonality between cisgender and transgender women's experiences, they indeed share Santiago's belief that there is a distinctly female way of life upon which womanhood is contingent.

== Death ==
On September 22, 2020, following complications from cancer, Santiago died of respiratory failure in Carolina at the age of 72, spending her final days in the care of Fred and her adopted son, Eddie. At the time of her death, Santiago had freshly graduated from the University of Puerto Rico with a degree in political science and was in the process of writing her second memoir.

== Community impact ==
Collective queer resistance in Puerto Rico is thought to have begun in 1974 with the creation of the Comunidad de Orgullo Gay de Puerto Rico, which also established a small community center. Located in San Juan, "Casa Orgullo" was the meeting space of the first organized group of LGBTQ activists on the island. Inspired by the Stonewall riots of 1969 and the notable participation of queer Puerto Ricans such as Santiago over the course of that summer, the founding members of Casa Orgullo set the stage for future LGBTQ movements in Puerto Rico well beyond their own disbanding in 1976 — ironically the same year that Santiago returned to the island.

=== Violence against queer Puerto Ricans ===
Despite the cavalier attitude with which Santiago often described her transition and legal battles, her notability and position as a trans role model stem largely from the noted danger of such transparency in Puerto Rico, even to this day. Since the creation of the commonwealth, queer history in Puerto Rico has been characterized by a lack of governmental protections as well as exorbitant amounts of discriminatory violence. However, this violence was largely ignored until Ángel Colón Maldonado, referred to as the "Angel of the Bachelors," was arrested for killing up to 30 gay Puerto Rican men in the 1980s, resulting in a highly-publicized investigation and trial between 1985 and 1987. Maldonado is now serving a life sentence for three confirmed murders.

In 2002, Puerto Rican legislators passed a hate crime law protecting sexual orientation and gender identity, but it has rarely been invoked since its passing. As a result of this governmental unwillingness to discuss Puerto Rican homophobia and transphobia, the vast majority of LGBTQ murders (particularly those of trans individuals) that have occurred during the 21st century remain unsolved. According to the TransLatina Coalition, the murders of transgender people in the U.S. disproportionately take place in Puerto Rico, comprising nearly half of the U.S. total as recently as 2020.

=== Birth certificate changes ===
In 2017 — over 40 years after Santiago first garnered national attention for changing her legal gender — American civil rights organization Lambda Legal filed a lawsuit against the Puerto Rican government to allow transgender individuals to legally change the genders on their birth certificates without requiring transitional surgery (the loophole which Santiago had first utilized in the 1970s). In their lawsuit, Lambda Legal invoked the 14th amendment's guarantee of equal rights to citizens and discouraged the Puerto Rican practice of visibly striking out corrections to birth certificates. In 2018, the District Court sided with Lambda Legal and ordered the Puerto Rican government to issue accurate birth certificates to Puerto Rican residents upon request. As of April 2018, the Demographic Registrar makes official corrections "upon receipt of certification by a professional of the gender identity of the applicant."

=== Posthumous legislation ===
As of October 15, 2020, Medicaid in Puerto Rico offers coverage for gender reassignment surgeries, hormonal treatments, and other gender transition-related medical fees.

On October 30, 2020 (approximately a month following Santiago's passing), the Joint Commission on Social and Community Development and Gender and Health Affairs, Emergencies and Disaster Administration of the Municipal Legislature of San Juan virtually convened over Zoom to discuss the renaming of the TranSalud Clinic in Santiago's honor. The measure was presented to the committee by mayoral advisor José F. Chaves Ortiz and José Rabell Cancio, a public policy advisor in the San Juan Department of Municipal Health. During the presentation, Chaves highlighted that the TranSalud Clinic was the only Puerto Rican health facility specifically geared towards serving the needs of the trans community and that Santiago's decades of openness about her life experiences had expanded trans rights across the island. The commission approved the proposal on November 4, 2020.

== See also ==
- Christine Jorgensen
- LGBT rights in Puerto Rico
- List of Puerto Ricans
