= Hip-hop feminism =

Sub-set of black feminism

Hip-hop feminism is a sub-set of black feminism that centers on intersectional subject positions involving race and gender in a way that acknowledges the contradictions in being a black feminist, such as black women's enjoyment in hip-hop music and culture, rather than simply focusing on the victimization of black women in hip hop culture due to interlocking systems of oppressions involving race, class, and gender.

== Definitions ==
The term hip-hop feminism was coined by the American author Joan Morgan in her book When Chickenheads Come Home to Roost: A Hip Hop Feminist Breaks it Down. Morgan explains that a hip-hop feminist is a self-defined name for black feminists that acknowledges black women's lived experiences as they identify with and enjoy hip-hop culture along with supporting feminist issues and agendas where black women are marginalized by the mainstream feminist movement because of their race or the black antiracist movements due to their gender.

Hip-hop feminism has various definitions and scholarly inventions to help understand how hip-hop sensibilities influence not only music but also different forms of black expressions as well as feminist and anti-racist social justice movements.

In When Chickenheads Come Home to Roost: A Hip-Hop Feminist Breaks it Down, Morgan explains that she coined the term hip-hop feminism because she was unable to fully identify with feminism without acknowledging and embracing her enjoyment in misogynistic hip-hop music and elements of patriarchy. Morgan explains that the term hip-hop feminism is used to express the ambiguities and contradictions of being a black feminist who still enjoys certain aspects of a patriarchal and misogynistic society, such as enjoying hip-hop music that reaffirms rather than challenges misogyny, which she calls "fucking with the greys."

In The Stage Hip Hop Feminism Built: A New Directions Essay, Aisha Durham, Brittany C. Cooper, and Susana M. Morris define hip-hop feminism as a form of black feminism rooted in the lived experiences of black feminists and members of the African Diaspora along with the political prerogatives and aesthetics of hip hop culture that builds on previous black feminist thought. They also stress the importance of black women and girls as well as women and girls of color remaining central within analyses of hip hop culture.

Hip-hop feminism acknowledges the problematic, misogynist nature of culture and its formative effects on young black women and empowers them by enabling participation, response, and owning self-identification.

Further, it aims to affirm Black women and girls' lived experiences and contributions to hip hop culture, such as Double Dutch, childhood chants, and twerking, that are less culturally recognizable in comparison to more traditional and masculine forms of expression in hip hop culture, such as "emceeing, deejaying, graffiti, and b-boying/b-girling." It can also be used to provide a more gender-inclusive study of Black women and queer folks' involvement and expression in hip hop culture rather than focusing on cisgender Black boys and men as hip hop subjects.

== Misogyny and social change ==
Hip-hop music and music videos, as mediums easily spread through the internet, mass media, and popular culture, are perfect platforms for motivating social change. It can also be used to recognize intersections between communities.

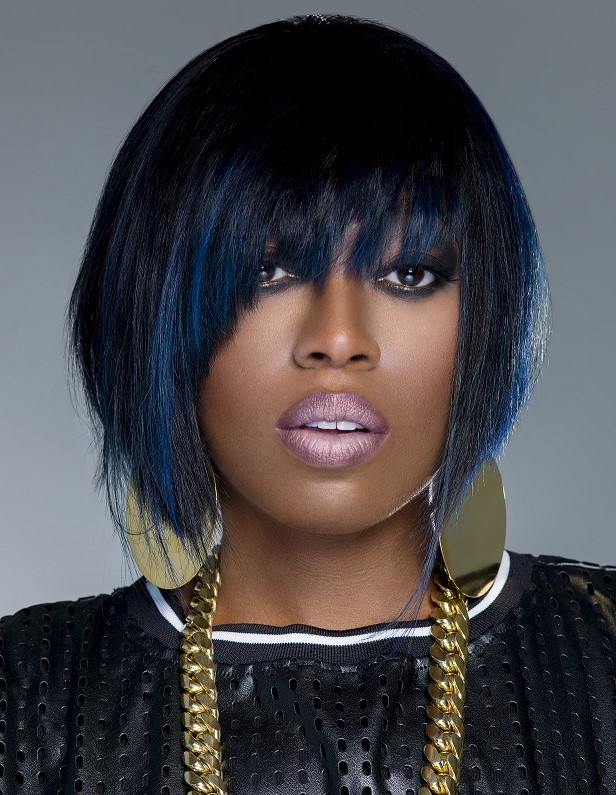
Missy Elliott, a hip-hop feminist

Rabaka explains the way in which creative mediums such as hip-hop can be used to wreck the interlocking systems of oppression in America:

"The point is to offer the women of the hip-hop generation feminist and womanist alternatives to the patriarchal (mis)representations of womanhood spewing out of the US. culture industries. Whether they meant to or not, "the women of the hip hop generation have created a body of work that offers up feminist or womanist answers to many of the hip hop generation's most urgent interpersonal, cultural, social, and political issues" and "recent feminist scholarship suggests that in its own controversial and/or contradictory way the hip-hop feminist movement may very well be the most politically polyvocal and socially visible manifestation of the ongoing evolution of the Women's Liberation movement prevalent in contemporary US society".

Hip hop feminism can be situated within Afrofuturism to understand how hip hop feminism operates both within and outside of academia as well as examine and critique the marginalized experiences of Black people throughout time.

In Growing Up Where 'No One Looked Like Me': Gender, Race, Hip Hop and Identity in Vancouver, Gillian Creese uses interviews from second generation African-Canadian men and women in their analysis of how the sociocultural understanding of blackness and hip hop influence the experiences of African-Canadian youth growing up in communities where they are one of the few Black/African children within the community.

Creese found that Black/African-Canadian men's experiences differed from Black/African-Canadian women's experiences because of how hip hop in youth culture allows black men to be seen as "Cool Black" and have an easier time connecting and being popular in school due to the cultural view of Black masculinity as "cool" in comparison to the lack of "Cool Black" femininity in hip hop culture, where culturally Black women are seen as hypersexual, 'exotic,' or 'whitewashed' version of Black femininity.

In 1992, R&B singer Mary J. Blige released What's the 411? on Uptown/MCA Records and was considered the pioneer of hip-hop feminism. In If You Look in My Life: Love, Hip-Hop Soul, and Contemporary African American Womanhood, author Treva B. Lindsey documents Blige's diverse musical influences and claims that, "...these diverse influences sparked a sonic innovation that generated a unique space for African American women's storytelling and narrative (re)articulations of love and contemporary black womanhood."

What's the 411? Was ground-breaking given its success and permitted Blige's entry into a musical arena almost entirely regulated and mediated by men. Lindsey further claims that by crafting woman-authored narratives and performing "woman-centered hip-hop era storytelling" artists such as Blige prove, "...that the voices of black women hip-hop soul singers create a distinctively hip-hop feminist space within a male-dominated soundscape." Such artists created a distinct space within hip-hop for explorations of African American womanhood and dynamically brought light to issues of representation in narratives and stories in hip-hop—opening doors for rising women hip-hop artists.

Behind Queen Latifah came hip-hop artist Lauryn Hill who became the best example of hip-hop feminism with record-breaking worldwide sales of her album The Miseducation of Lauryn Hill and has won five Grammy awards in 1998. Artists such as Latifah and Hill mimicked the hip hop rhetoric of males in the scene and generated a massive amount of attention. Missy Elliott was often seen dressed similar to male hip-hop artists and utilized the same body language and aggressive delivery of her lyrics as a means of protest, while still preserving her femininity. Even after losing weight over the years, she made sure that while performing videos the camera were faced to her face and her dancing.

These artists have carved out a new politically conscious identity in Hip-hop for women. Artists such as Nicki Minaj have changed the way fashion and sexuality is viewed in hip-hop. She uses the way in which she expresses herself through her body to send a message that being comfortable in your skin and with your sexuality is okay. These issues don't only affect the United States, as hip-hop has traveled and inspired movements beyond American borders. In Cuba, a hip-hop trio group known as Las Krudas Cubensi rap about commonly overlooked challenges that people of color, specifically women of color, face.

In the 2010s, hip-hop feminists moved past the male rhetoric and doused the genre in feminine prose. For example, many modern hip-hop feminists utilize their voluptuous figures in a commanding manner rather than adopting male rapper outfitting and lyric style. Aisha Durham writes that hip hop aided in creating a style icon out of the female black body. Durham also stated a solution to the problem of patriarchy, homophobia, misogyny, et cetera that is present in hip-hop: hip-hop feminism. She stated, "[Hip hop feminists] are moving and mobilizing and rescuing ourselves from virtual action blocks ... Hip-hop feminism is the answer (to) rap."

Rihanna is another mainstream hip-hop feminist. In her most recent album "Anti," her lyrics assert black female independence. Given Rihanna's past, the hip-hop feminist scene looked to her as a role model to stand up for domestic violence against the black female body. Many women artists have played a big role in how hip hop has evolved.

== Hip hop feminist scholars ==
In the foundational text When Chickenheads Come Home to Roost: A Hip Hop Feminist Breaks it Down, Joan Morgan coined the term hip hop feminism to discuss how black feminists can enjoy hip hop culture but still support feminist and antiracist movements despite the misogynistic elements of hip hop, which acknowledges the "grays" of social life because we can enjoy these "problematic" cultural artifacts and continue to support social change.

=== Msia Clark ===
Msia Clark's Hip Hop and Africa: Prophets of the City and Dustyfoot Philosophers, explores Hip Hop culture in Africa specifically focusing on women within African hop. In addition to Hip Hop and Africa she has published various academic articles that explore the experiences of women within the African Hip Hop scene. In her work, Clark looks to understand Hip Hop as a method of protest and challenging of social norms. Her article Feminisms in African Hip Hop dissects the intricacies of being a woman within African Hip Hop. She explains the ways in which an artist's country shapes the content of their music, highlighting artists such as Dope Saint Jude from South Africa who challenge notions of partiarchy, heteronormativity, and misogynoir. Much of her works also address the relationship and discourse between feminist activists, scholars, and rappers. Clark is currently a professor at Howard University where she teaches the course Black Women and Pop.

=== Seth Cosimini ===
Seth Cosimini's analysis of the performativity and self-presentation of Nicki Minaj articulates how women in hip-hop culture may simultaneously challenge and conform to stereotypical representations of femininity. As explained by Cosimini, Minaj uses contradictory public personas in order to construct a hip-hop identity that recognizes the social oppression driven by race, gender, and sexuality within and beyond hip-hop culture. Cosimini's contributions to hip-hop feminist scholarship have offered a unique perspective on the role of self-presentation in identity construction for women in hip-hop.

=== Murali Balaji ===
Murali Balaji has contributed to existing research on the roles of "video vixens" in hip-hop. Balaji argues that hip-hop music video models have the opportunity to utilize a sense of agency in order to negotiate their positions within hip-hop culture. Through an analysis of Melyssa Ford's music video career, Balaji highlights how it is possible for women in hip-hop to harness their sexuality as a form of political resistance. By way of carefully calculated self-presentation, video vixens are given the chance to subvert objectification and benefit from their own commodification.

=== Reiland Rabaka ===
Reiland Rabaka examines the history of the hip-hop genre, looking at the Harlem Renaissance, the Black Arts movements and the Feminist Art movement. He critiques traditions in hip hop culture, highlighting black masculinity and how this masculinity is performed in hip hop. Rabaka assesses how this black masculinity is reproduced and consumed by the public, looking at white people in particular. Rabaka claims that critical scholarly inquiry can be applied to the hip hop movement. When understanding political and social activism, Rabaka says that the contributions of hip-hop must be considered.

=== Tauya Saunders ===
Tauya Saunders' Towards a transnational hip hop feminist liberatory praxis: a view from the Americas makes an intervention in U.S. hip hop feminism by explaining how a transnational approach of hip hop feminism would provide opportunities for international Black solidarity between Black folks within the U.S. and other non-English speaking countries throughout the Americas and empowerment of Black women throughout the Americas.

Saunders places emphasis on the importance of including hemispheric, non-English, equally marginalized (with varying struggles), black activists into American hip-hop feminist conversations. Saunders attempts to vocalize the need for greater connectivity between black mobilization in the United States and similar mobilization in the Global South, specifically Latin America and the Caribbean. She also stresses that without a transnational outreach that breaches language and geopolitical barriers, American hip-hop feminist praxis will, in fact, be limited.

Saunders also uses the word "artivism," which merges "artist" and "activist," in an argument stating that feminists in nations such as Cuba and Brazil, where hip-hop feminism is present, are not given enough credit for the agency and resistance that emerges from their art. Saunders urges hip-hop feminists in the United States to recognize their privilege as a referent for activist movements, and the power, privilege, and responsibility that comes with living in a global hegemony.

=== Michael P. Jefferies ===
Michael P. Jefferies's Hip Hop Feminism and Failure makes an intervention in hip hop feminism scholarship by discussing how hip hop feminism being institutionalization within academia impacts the relationship between hip hop communities outside of academia and academic hip hop feminist circles because hip hop feminist scholarship loses its anti-establishment or radicalness nature by being institutionalized within the system it aims to critique. Another intervention Jefferies make is his claim that hip hop feminists must acknowledge inconsistencies concerning labeling various (often male) hip hop rappers as being either "socially conscious" and/or "commercial" based on the subject matter within their music given how "socially conscious" rappers are still capable of reproducing sexist or problematic societal behaviors within their music. Jefferies also explains that a stimulus-based inconsistency involves us feeling "a dope line" before "we know it" to explain how people's affective responses to listening to rap music with problematic lyrics cause them to ignore the problematic lyrics of the song because they enjoy the musical and sexual sensation and performance of hip hop.

=== Gwendolyn Pough ===
In the chapter "My Cipher Keeps Movin' Like a Rolling Stone: Black Women's Expressive Cultures and Black Feminist Legacies" of Check It While Wreck It: Black Womanhood, Hip Hop Culture, and the Public Sphere, Gwendolyn D. Pough explains that hip hop feminism is a subset of black feminisms that allows black feminist scholars to critique and expand Black feminist thought. Black feminist and third wave feminists that examined hip hop culture and rap through a feminist lens have taken various approaches to discussing rap and Black women. For instance, feminists may condone sexist rap music, provide critiques of how the cultural production and consumption of sexist rap music is shaped by larger society's perpetration and upholding of sexism, and/or discuss their enjoyment and love of rap despite its sexism in hip hop culture but also speak out against sexism and misogyny in hip hop.

She also makes an intervention in hip hop feminist scholarship by stating that feminist scholars should also analyze Black female rappers' music because feminists have primarily focused on male rappers and male misogyny within their music. Pough states that examining Black women's rappers' work would provide feminist scholars the opportunity to analyze how women in hip hop challenge sexism within hip hop as well as within the larger society.

=== Aisha Durham ===
Aisha Durham refers to the work of communication scholars when discussing the role of the black woman's body in hip-hop culture. With an epistemological approach, Durham cites her own experiences in hip-hop, touching on how the black female body is sexualized and policed within the hip-hop industry. Her work examines how black women in hip hop are depicted and challenges media representations and objectification. She emphasizes that through hip-hop, artists communicate with other artists, the public and the media.

=== Rachel Raimist ===
Rachel Raimist identifies as a professor, filmmaker, and a crunk feminist. She is a member of the Crunk Feminist Collective since 2010, the Crunks is a collective of feminist activists, scholars, and, artists. Raimist earned her B.A. and M.F.A degree in directing, but she also earned her M.A. degree in women's studies and her Ph.D. in feminist studies. Being able to teach and the love for storytelling and cameras gave students the accessibility to learn about filming and the roles of females behind the scenes through her.

Her research helps train females get comfortable with cameras and getting into the entertainment industry. Raimist mainly focuses on "feminist filmmaking, women of color feminisms, hip-hop feminism, pedagogy, and digital storytelling." Raimist also taught global cinema, digital photography and women's literature on Semester at Sea.

== Use of visual and audio elements ==
Visual and audio elements, including editing, narrative, and performance, also can be analyzed in hip hop feminism. A song's lyrical content may be considered feminist, while the visual content of its corresponding music video may not be.

Performers may use strategic queerness to disrupt the hegemonic racist, sexist, homophobic, and patriarchal scripts that try to capture or recognize her as a "compliant" and authentic black female subject that embodies what it seen as properly feminine or queer.

There are some opportunities for women to resist a Hip-Hop video culture that simply fetishizes their bodies and limits them to a "One-Dimensional Womanhood". This resistance became extremely prevalent in the 1990s with artists like Erykah Badu, Missy Elliott, and Lauryn Hill. Rather than conforming to this hyper-sexualized, and powerless image these women used their music videos to challenge these heteronormative and patriarchal motifs, by asserting their independence and strength.

The lyrical and visual objectification of women within hip hop may be a means for men to cope with a lack of normative indicators of heterosexual masculine power and the presence of insecurities associated with self-worth, racial discrimination, and access to various types of resources.

== Producers ==
In regards to female producers in hip-hop, Joseph Schloss' Making Beats: The Art of Sample-Based Hip-Hop briefly discusses the presence of Black women in hip-hop as producers specifically. "...beyond the lack of role models, the abstract masculinization of the role of the producer requires a potential female producer to follow conceptual and behavioral norms that presume a male constituency." Schloss points to the rigidity of gender in hip-hop and production, and this idea that women must masculinize themselves in order to find entrance and success in producing.

The lack of female producers in hip-hop stems from the lack of opportunities and access to learn how to produce; Rose attributes this to the societal barriers women face when seeking education in technology. Along with the masculine presence in hip-hop, women rarely find a chance to hone their production skills in the typical intimate house settings men usually engage because they don't feel "comfortable spending such extended time in a male neighbor's home.". These barriers in hip-hop hinder Black women from standing at the forefront despite their abilities to produce in the earlier days of the genre, and continue to place an emphasis on sound as an object these women create as labor.

== Feminism and the elements of hip-hop ==
Graffiti is regarded as an element of hip hop. Graffiti as a subculture is one that has overlapped with hip hop feminism. Though women actively participate in the graffiti subculture, they are often underrepresented and underestimated. Graffiti gives female writers the opportunity to demonstrate the importance of community and claiming space in a visual way through their work which ties back to the role that hip hop plays in society, particularly for female writers. Its secrecy has made graffiti a form of expression that is not judged at the surface level by gender, since you can't truly tell who made the graffiti.

Breakdancing is also a part of hip hop. Breakdancing is also male dominated, similar to both deejaying and graffiti. Women get mixed reactions about this form of art—a woman from the female crew Full Circle spoke about how when a man lost to her in a battle, he said that it was because it was hard to focus because he was attracted to her because she was a girl.

== Hip hop feminism in literature ==
Brittany Cooper's "Maybe I'll Be a Poet, Rapper": Hip-Hop Feminism and Literary Aesthetics in Push" examines the literary aesthetics of hip hop in street literature (or hip hop literature) by Black women authors, such as Sapphire's Push, to discuss how black women authors of hip hop literature are able to show connections between other Black musical and literary texts, traditions, and histories as well as create works exploring Black female subjectivity with hip hop sensibilities.

== See also ==
- Hip hop and social injustice
- Homosexuality and hip hop culture
- Hip-hop
