= Misogyny in rap music =

Controversy in hip-hop

Misogyny in rap music is defined as lyrics, videos, or other components of rap music that endorse or legitimize the objectification, exploitation, or victimization of women. The definition includes innuendos, stereotyping, and defamatory portrayals of women.

Content analyses have found that approximately 22% to 37% of rap lyrics contain content classified by researches as misogynistic, varying by subgenre. Adams and Fuller state that there are six themes that are considered to be misogynistic in rap: derogatory statements about women related to sex; comments linking malicious actions against women in relation to sex; portrayals of women as the sources for men's problems; depictions of women as exploitative of men; statements suggesting women are inferior to men; and statements suggesting women are disposable to men. A study of Detroit-based rapper Eminem's third studio album The Marshall Mathers LP (2000) found instances of misogyny in eleven of the fourteen songs on his record. Other analyses note recurring elements such as the use of derogatory terms ("bitch" and "ho(e)"), sexual objectification of women, normalizing violence against women, distrust of women, disparagement of sex workers, and the glorification of pimping.

Scholars have offered various explanations for the presence of misogyny in rap music. Some have argued that rap artists use misogynistic lyrics and portrayals of women as a way to assert their masculinity and authenticity within the genre Others argue that it reflects broader societal attitudes toward women, and that rap artists have internalized negative stereotypes about women. Economic perspectives suggest that rappers who use misogynistic content can be commercially advantageous.

Responses to misogyny in hip-hop music have ranged from criticism by women's rights activists, student protests, organized campaigns, and a 2007 congressional hearing. Some women rap artists have opposed misogyny through their music or advocacy efforts. In one study, women rappers accounted for only five of ninety misogynistic songs, as well as an additional 8 songs (out of the remaining 313) that did not have misogynistic lyrics. "The scarcity of women artists shows just how male-dominated rap was during this time, especially at the platinum level".

== Themes ==
Ronald Weitzer and Charis E. Kubrin (2009) have identified five common misogynistic themes in rap lyrics: (a) derogatory naming and shaming of women, (b) sexual objectification of women, (c) legitimization of violence against women, (d) distrust of women, and (e) celebration of prostitution and pimping. Sexual objectification is the most common misogynistic theme in rap music according to Weitzer and Kubrin, whose 2009 analysis found that 67% of the examined rap lyrics sexually objectified women.

In misogynistic songs, women are described using derogatory names such as "bitches", "hoes", or "chickenheads". These insults, scholars say, seek to degrade them and keep them "in their place". And according to scholars, women of color, specifically black women, are more likely to be featured as sexual objects in such videos than their white counterparts.

=== Partner violence in hip-hop ===
Misogynistic rap may depict instances of physical violence and rape as responses to women who challenge male domination or refuse sexual advances. In Juvenile's song March Nigga Step, he raps, "If she thinks you're jokin', is she goin' get a quick chokin'?". Popular rap artists such as Eminem and Odd Future have been criticized for their depictions of violence against women.

Some male rappers have referenced or mocked their female counterparts in lyrics, including instances involving domestic abuse or violence. For example, in the song "Circo Loco", Drake included a lyric interpreted by some listeners as making light of Megan Thee Stallion's shooting incident involving being shot in the foot while in a car with Tory Lanez.

A related sub-theme involves boasting about sex acts that harm or are painful for women. Some misogynistic rap songs portray women as untrustworthy or unworthy of respect. Women are depicted as femmes fatales, "gold diggers", and as dishonest about sexual matters. Tupac Shakur (Hell 4 A Hustler) asks, "Why plant seeds in a dirty bitch, waitin' to trick me? Not the life for me". At the same time, pimps are glorified; their ability to control and exploit women is praised.

=== Degradation of African-American women ===
Scholars have noted that portrayals of African American women often draw on racial and gender stereotypes dating back to the post-slavery era. Some researchers suggest the persistence of such stereotypes contributes to the normalization of misogynistic depictions of African American women. Analyses of rap music videos have found that portrayals of African American women in rap music videos often reflect "controlling images.". This form of discrimination has been labeled "misogynoir," a term used by Black feminist Patricia Hill Collins to describe anti-Black racism and sexism towards Black women in visual and digital culture in the US. The term was coined by Moya Bailey in 2008.

A study of images of African American women in rap music videos revealed three common stereotypes: "Jezebel", "Sapphire", and "Mami/Baby Mama". In its analysis of 38 rap music videos, author Emerson points out that the videos contain the ideologically controlling image of the hypersexual "jezebel" as well as images of agency, independence, strength, and autonomy. Emerson also points out that the videos often feature reversals of the traditional focus on women's bodies from the male gaze. Instead, she notes that the videos have in common "the construction of the male body, and particularly the black male body, as the object of Black female pleasure".

Lindsay Melanie builds off this work, writing, "Based on these three stereotypes, the videos present African American women as greedy, dishonest, sex objects, with no respect for themselves or others, including the children under their care. The women in the videos are scorned by men and exist to bring pleasure to them". Another study found that gangsta rap often depicts women, specifically African American women, as sexualized or subordinate figures to men.

Some scholars note that misogynistic descriptions of black women in rap music are most often produced by male artists, which may reflect broader tensions of gender dynamics within African American communities. Academic Denise Herd writes, "Sexism is visible, vulgar, aggressive and popular, fueled by a complex of factors including sexism in black communities that influence rappers' attitudes and lyrics as well as the patriarchal values permeating the wider society".

Effects of Influence

The rise in popularity of Gangsta rap propagated stereotypes that influenced children growing up in 90s' America. While misogyny in the music industry existed before Gangsta rap became mainstream, the lyrics of Gangsta rap explicitly objectified and put down black women. This was done with the purpose of making the rapper seem more masculine and, as this became common, it normalized and directly contributed to the growing misogyny in the music industry and society. This misogyny often appeared in specific forms like innuendo or defamation.

In the music's lyrics, some stereotypes of black women such as the “Jezebel” were adapted to modern contexts as the "Bitch" or the "Ho," and some haven't changed but are just as prevalent, such as the “Gold Digger.” The “Jezebel” is described as a hypersexual or even predatory black woman. A woman who actively seeks out sex. This word isn't used as often in modern contexts, but the concept of it has evolved over time and took root in the music industry. The song “Aint No Fun (If The Homies Cant Have None)" by Snoop Dogg is entirely about portraying women as sex objects, as can be seen in the following lines:

“And then I'm through with it, there's nothing else to do with it

Pass it to the homie, now you hit it

Because she ain't nothing but a bitch to me

And y'all know, that bitches ain't shit to me”

The song objectifies women and portrays them as wanting nothing but sex. These kinds of songs popularized a growing stereotype that all women are “bitches” and only value sex. Another example can be found in “A Bitch Iz A Bitch” by NWA, which includes the lines:

“Now the title bitch don't apply to all women But all women have a little bitch in 'em”

Despite saying the term doesn't apply to all women, the song immediately contradict itself. It encourages the listener to see all women through the same misogynistic lens. The “Gold Digger” is another common stereotype of women that depicts them as only wanting money and being willing to do anything to get it. The stereotype depicts such women as being devoid of morals or self respect. Representing women in this way is prevalent in the hip-hop community and especially in the rap community. The "Gold Digger" can also be found in “A Bitch Iz A Bitch” by NWA. Further into the song, the lyrics say:

“Yo, you can tell a girl that's out for the money

She look good and the bitch walk funny

She ain't no dummy, she's rather conniving

Yo bitch, fuck what I'm driving

See a young nigga that's striving

You're through without a BMW

That's why a bitch is a bitch I guess”

These lyrics imply that women who look a certain way are only after your money and further enforce the “Gold Digger” stereotype.

These stereotypes are used a lot in Hip-Hop music, especially Gangsta rap. Reasons for their inclusion could include internalized beliefs, boosting the rapper's masculinity, conforming with genre norms, or scapegoating black women. Music with these lyrics could be very lucrative, even if the artist didn't hold the values their songs purported.

== Rationale ==
=== Hyper-Masculinity ===
Scholars note that the hip-hop aesthetic and sound often emphasizes hyper-masculinity. Since the genre's emergence in the 1980s, hip-hop has been frequently been associated with masculine imagery. Scholars have linked early representations of masculinity in hip-hop to social and economic conditions in areas such as the South Bronx. As the genre expanded, some studies suggest that its masculine ideals increasingly incorporated sexist and homophobic themes. Researchers describe hip-hop as a largely Homosocial space where pressures to display masculinity have intensified over time. Some scholars argue that certain artists use sexual, misogynistic, and homophobic lyrics to affirm masculine identity within the genre. One documentary explores mannerisms and ideologies among mainstream hip-hop culture. The film also discusses how associations with violence can reinforce stereotypes of Black men.

Some scholars claim rap's misogynistic lyrics contribute to cultural tolerance of sexual assault, with one writing that they add to the "perpetuation of rape culture and rape myth acceptance". Under this perspective, rap music promotes and reflects rape culture, defined by one author as, "a complex of beliefs supporting a continuum of threatened violence against women that ranges from sexual remarks to rape itself". Some researchers interpret "gangsta rap" as a cultural expression of artists' lived experiences, rather than solely structurally-oriented factors.

Sociologist Elijah Anderson links the treatment of women in hip-hop culture with troubled gender relations in inner-city Black and Latino communities. In an ethnographic study of inner-city Philadelphia neighborhoods, Anderson found that young men in Black/Latino neighborhoods attempt to raise their social status and self-esteem by demeaning and exploiting women. Anderson writes that "[in] many cases the more the young man seems to exploit the young woman, the higher is his regard within the peer group".

The "Hyper-Masculine" image portrayed by Gangsta rap also normalized violence and popularized that ideology to children in the 90s. A good example is Tupac Shakur. “Tupac was constantly in the media limelight- for the revenue he generated selling millions of records and for the chaotic gangsta life he led. He was arrested a number of times for assault and was charged with sexual abuse, for which he was sentenced to four and a half years in prison (though he was bailed out shortly after). (Iwamoto, Pg. 44)”. Regardless of his criminal history, people still saw Tupac as an idol and his actions were glorified by the public, enforcing the idea that being a violent and overly masculine person was a good thing.

=== Hip-Hop National Language ===
Scholars have observed that language used in hip-hop is highly gendered. Some researchers argue that artists and listeners navigate hip-hop through systems that center heterosexual power dynamics. Within this framework, Hip-Hop Nation Language (HHNL) is often described as privileging the Black male experience. One academic, argues that certain gender tropes within HHNL reinforce sexual hierarchies. Intersections of race and gender within HHNL are said to sustain heteromasculinity that marginalized Black women and queer rappers who engage with it.

Another scholar suggests that lyrics by some Black male artists reflect deeply seated hetero-masculine norms within hip-hop, and that challenging these norms is necessary for Black women and queer artists to use HHNL. For this scholar, artists like Missy Elliott, Queen Latifah, Megan Thee Stallion, and Noname exemplify this resistance. "Their purposeful use of alternative HHNL to make statements about self and body, as well as Black female subjectivity and womanhood more broadly, are statements that few women could ever do publicly".

=== Commercial incentives ===
Some argue that the use of misogyny in hip-hop music helps rappers gain commercial success. While hip-hop began as a producer-based art form among the working class and poor African American and Puerto Rican youth, some claim that its transformation into a global consumer product has influenced its treatment of women. During the 1990s, record executives began to urge hip-hop artists to write more violent and offensive lyrics at the demand of hip-hop audiences. Academic Margaret Hunter suggests that in this period the commercialization of hip-hop for largely white audiences became linked to the overwhelming objectification of women of color in rap lyrics and videos.

In describing the predominance of images of women of color, specifically in the ever-present strip-club scenes in modern hip-hop music videos, Hunter states that, "because these sexual transactions are also racial, part of their appeal to buying audiences is the reinforcement of dominant narratives about African American and Latina women, and the concomitant symbolic protection of white femininity by its absence in representations". However, some feel that, "the misogyny has always been there". Serena Kim, features editor for Vibe magazine states, "...it's different now because the culture is bigger and mainstream. Now every kid in America is well-versed in hip-hop".

=== Channeling of wider cultural misogyny ===
Many scholars have argued that misogyny in hip-hop culture is a product of misogyny within American culture at large. Scholars Adams and Fuller suggest that hip-hop artists have internalized negative stereotypes about women that are prevalent in American society after witnessing women being treated poorly growing up. Michael Eric Dyson states that misogyny is a tried-and-true American tradition from which hip-hop derives its understanding of how men and women should behave. Similarly, Charlise Cheney argues that hip-hop's misogyny and promotion of traditional gender roles reflect mainstream American values.

Journalists Jeff Chang and David Zirkin contend that the misogyny extant in American popular culture provides "incentives for young men of color to act out a hard-core masculinity". Author Kate Burns argues, in the same vein, that the discourse of hip-hop culture is shaped by its environment, stating that rather than asking, "What is rap's influence on American society and culture?", critics should ask, "What has been society's role in shaping and influencing hip-hop?"

Black feminist bell hooks suggests that misogyny in hip-hop culture is not a "male black thing" but has its roots in a larger pattern of hostility toward women in American culture. She cautions against singling out criticism against rap music while accepting and perpetuating less raw and vulgar expressions of misogyny that permeate American society. She writes that it is "much easier to attack gangsta rap than to confront the culture that produces [the] need [for gangsta rap]". Others have reiterated this concern, arguing hip-hop's content is no more misogynistic than other forms of popular discourse. Academic Leola Johnson, for instance, asserts:

The misogynist lyrics of gangsta rap are hateful indeed, but they do not represent a new trend in Black popular culture, nor do they differ fundamentally from woman hating discourses that are common among White men. The danger of this insight is that it might be read as an apology for Black misogyny.

Another study states:

Of particular importance are those aspects of the music that frequently appear in the midst of political debates and media hype. Often, these aspects are scrutinized not with the intent of acquiring more excellent and more nuanced understandings of the art form, but rather to further one political agenda or produce a nice sound bite. The misogyny in rap music is one such case.

== Prevalence ==
Overt misogyny in rap music emerged in the late 1980s, and has since then been a feature of the music of numerous hip-hop artists. A 2005 content analysis of six outlets of media found that music contained substantially more sexual content than any other media outlets. A survey of adolescents showed that 66% of black girls and 57% of black boys believe that rap music videos portray black women in "bad and offensive ways". Gangsta rap, the most commercially successful sub genre of hip-hop, has been particularly criticized and associated with misogyny.

In a 2001 content analysis of gangsta rap, sociologists Charis E. Kubrin and Ronald Weitzer claimed that approximately 22% of the examined rap lyrics featured violence against women, including depictions of assault, murder and rape. They reported that the prevalence of misogynistic themes in songs were as follows: name-calling and shame account for 49%, sexual objectification accounts for 67%, distrust of women at 47%, acts of violence against women account for 18%, and human trafficking account for 20%. By contrast, in a similar study by sociologist Edward G. Armstrong, Eminem scored 78% for violent misogyny. Of the eighteen songs on his 2000 album The Marshall Mathers LP, eleven contain violent and misogynistic lyrics, nine of which referred to killing women.

In 2003, Pancho McFarland conducted an analysis of Chicano rap and found that Chicano rappers depict women as sex objects, morally and intellectually inferior, and objects of violence. 37% of Chicano rap songs depicted women as sex objects and 4% mentioned violence against women. Except for the "good mother" figure, all other women that were mentioned in the sample were portrayed negatively. Moreover, Chicano rappers who discussed sex and sexuality almost always depicted women as objects of domination for men.

Conrad, Dixon and Zhang (2009) investigated rap music videos and noted that there has been a shift from violent portrayals to more sexual misogynistic ones. Women in rap videos are placed in positions of objectification and sexual submission to their male counterparts. The researchers argue that this "suggests that there are important gender differences occurring that prefer men over women".

According to Weitzer and Kubrin's 2009 analysis, 22% of rap songs surveyed in their study contained misogynistic lyrics. The researchers noted that according to some studies, women are also presented as subordinate to men in a majority of rock and country music videos. The analysis also indicates that rap's misogynistic messages are rather extreme. Rap music has been noted for the graphic nature of some lyrics depicting women in sexualized or subordinate roles while other genres, may be less overt.

== Impact ==
Experimental research has attempted to measure the effects of exposure to rap music. Numerous studies have found a correlation between consumption of misogynistic hip-hop music and negative beliefs about women. Webster et al. found that men who listened to sexually violent gangsta rap lyrics were significantly more likely than controls to express "adversarial sexual beliefs", like the belief that men should dominate women. However, they noted that gangsta rap did not influence men's other attitudes toward women.

Other studies showed that rap videos which contain images of women in sexually subordinate roles increase female or woman subjects' acceptance of violence against women, and that listening to misogynistic hip-hop increases sexually aggressive behavior in men. Women and men are more likely to accept sexist and demeaning messages about gender relations after listening to music with sexually degrading lyrics. However, college students who listen to this music are even more likely to say that they find these lyrics to be accurate and acceptable portrayals of romantic and sexual relationships.

Some researchers suggest that exposure to misogynistic lyrics in rap music may influence listeners’ attitudes toward women because a big portion of misogynistic things that are being said is being listened to by men.

Not only are women objectified and abused in lyrics to sexually explicit music, but the music also portrays the women as being lesser than men. According to the textbook Women: Images and Realities, this music sends the message to young adults, especially Black youth that their enemy is Black girls and women, since the music portrays women as selfish, untrustworthy, and as subordinate.

A 2007 study by Michael Cobb and William Boettcher found that exposure to rap music increases sexist attitudes toward women. Men who listened to rap music held more sexist beliefs than the control group. Women were also more likely to support sexism when rap music was not overtly misogynistic. However, they were less likely to hold sexist beliefs when the lyrics were very misogynistic. Rudman and Lee found that exposure to violent and misogynistic rap music strengthens the association between black men and negative attributes. People who are exposed to violent and misogynistic rap music are more likely to perceive black men as hostile and sexist.

Academics Johnnetta B. Cole and Beverly Guy-Sheftall, for instance, have expressed concern over the effects of misogyny in hip-hop culture on children, stating, "We are concerned because we believe that hip-hop is more misogynist and disrespectful of Black girls and women than other popular music genres. The casual references to rape and other forms of violence and the soft-porn visuals and messages of many rap music videos are seared into the consciousness of young Black boys and girls at an early age."

A longitudinal study indicated that young people who regularly listen to sexually degrading lyrics are more likely to have sex at an earlier age while exposure to non-degrading sexual content had no effect. Sexually degrading lyrics were found to be most common in rap music. The survey also suggests that repeated exposure to sexually degrading lyrics may lead girls to expect that they will be treated with disrespect by their partners and that they have to take a submissive role.

In a 2011 study, Gourdine and Lemmons identified age and listening habits as key factors which determine the perception and impact of misogyny in hip-hop music. They examined students aged 18 to 24 years and found that the older the participants were, the less they listened to rap music and that they reacted more negatively to misogynistic lyrics.

Along with the major studies conducted, some researchers report that misogyny in rap music could possibly create a different mindset among people. For example, children who grow up listening to misogynistic music may grow into feeling comfortable with talking to women in a manner that affects the way they might treat women in the future. Although this may not always be the case, some studies suggest that frequent exposure to misogynistic lyrics may be associated with changes in attitudes toward women among listeners.

In studies performed to assess the reactions of young males exposed to violent or sexist rap or music videos, participants reported an increased likelihood that they would engage in violence, a greater acceptance of violence, and a greater acceptance of violence against women than did those who were not exposed to these videos.

In a study researching the effects on women listeners, Ellen S. Nikodym found that in comparing the impact of an objectifying song to a neutral song there was "no significant differences between the two groups on measures of body shame, body surveillance, and depressive symptoms. There were significant differences between the two groups in terms of self-objectification, with those listening to the objectifying song reporting higher levels of self-objectification as shown by more statements that in some way said, "I am my body.""

=== Effects of misogynistic music in daily life ===
In the study, "Implicit and Explicit Consequences of Exposure to Violent and Misogynous Rap Music", researchers Rudman and Lee explored the consequences of rap music on everyday life and how it affected individuals' perception of black people. The researchers begin by stating information conducted by previous research that explained, "subjects exposed to violent rap music were less likely to hire a Black applicant for a job that required intelligence (whereas a White applicant was not discriminated against), suggesting that priming one aspect of the Black stereotype (violent) increases the accessibility of related stereotypic traits" (unintelligent; Macrae, Stangor, & Milne, 1994). With this previous research, Rudman and Lee wanted to provide information on how our actions are primed because of hostile rap music.

They did so by exposing their subjects to either rap or popular mainstream music and then provided them with a questionnaire that assessed how they explicitly and implicitly viewed Black men. The researchers hypothesized that, "Because we predicted that violent and misogynistic rap music would temporarily activate associations between Black men and negative attributes (e.g. hostile, violent, sexist), while simultaneously deactivating associations between Black men and positive attributes (e.g. calm, lawful, trustworthy) we used these attributes in our stereotype IAT".) Rudman and Lee then completed an experiment on 30 men that "tested the assumption that violent and misogynistic rap music would activate automatic Black stereotypes in high and low prejudiced subjects alike (Devine, 1989). Subjects were exposed to either rap or popular music and their stereotypes regarding Black men were then assessed, both implicitly and explicitly. It was expected that rap music subjects' stereotype IAT scores would be higher, relative to controls.

Explicit stereotypes were also obtained for comparison purposes". After listening to the explicit and profane music, the subjects completed the IAT test which resulted in the following: "Overall, subjects showed a strong tendency to associate Blacks with negative attributes and Whites with positive attributes. That is, subjects who performed the Black + negative task first were somewhat more likely to show automatic stereotyping, compared with subjects who performed the White + negative task first". The researchers concluded that, "Thus, exposure to violent and misogynistic rap music had the generalized effect of strengthening the association between Black men and negative attributes (e.g. hostile, criminal, sexist) and decreasing the association between Black men and positive attributes (e.g. calm, trustworthy, polite)".

== Response ==
In 2001, "Hip-Hop Minister", and former Nation of Islam Minister, Conrad Tillard feuded with Def Jam Recordings co-founder Russell Simmons, accusing him of stoking violence by allowing the frequent use of words such as "nigga" and "bitch" in rap lyrics. Tillard then organized a summit in Harlem over what he viewed as negative imagery in hip-hop. Simmons organized a counter-summit, urging the public not to "support open and aggressive critics of the hip-hop community".

In 2004, students at Spelman College protested rapper Nelly's music video "Tip Drill" and misogyny in rap music in general. The students criticized the negative portrayal and sexual objectification of African American women in the video, which showed women in bikinis dancing and simulating various sexual acts, men throwing money at women's genitals, and Nelly swiping a credit card through a woman's buttocks. Building on the momentum generated by the Spelman College protests, Essence magazine launched a twelve-month campaign entitled "Take Back the Music" to combat misogyny in hip-hop culture. However, the protests and subsequent campaign received little media coverage.

A congressional hearing was held on September 25, 2007, to examine misogyny and racism in hip-hop culture. The title of the hearing, "From Imus to Industry: The business of stereotypes and degrading images", referenced radio host Don Imus who called the Rutgers University women's basketball team "nappy-headed hos" and later blamed his choice of words on hip-hop. Rappers "demean and defame black women", Imus claimed, and call them "worse names than I ever did." The hearing seemed to have no impact and was largely ignored by the press.

However, not all accusations of misogyny in hip-hop have been taken seriously. In the case of Eminem's violence towards women, a poll run by Teen magazine illustrated that 74% of teenage girls would date Eminem if given the chance, despite his violence towards women in his music. In addition women listeners of T.O.'s pop hits radio station KISS 92 spoke about his music saying: "If you don't like it, turn it off," and "it's just fun and entertainment." This illustrates the fact that opinions differ among female or woman audiences.

Included in the list of prominent figures who have taken a stance on the subject, African-American scholar Lerone Bennett Jr stated that, "We ... need a new understanding—in the media, in the entertainment industry, in our churches, schools, and organizations—that popular songs are as important as civil rights bills and that a society who pays pipers to corrupt its young and to defame its women and mothers will soon discover that it has no civil rights to defend and no songs to sing."

=== Female hip-hop artists ===
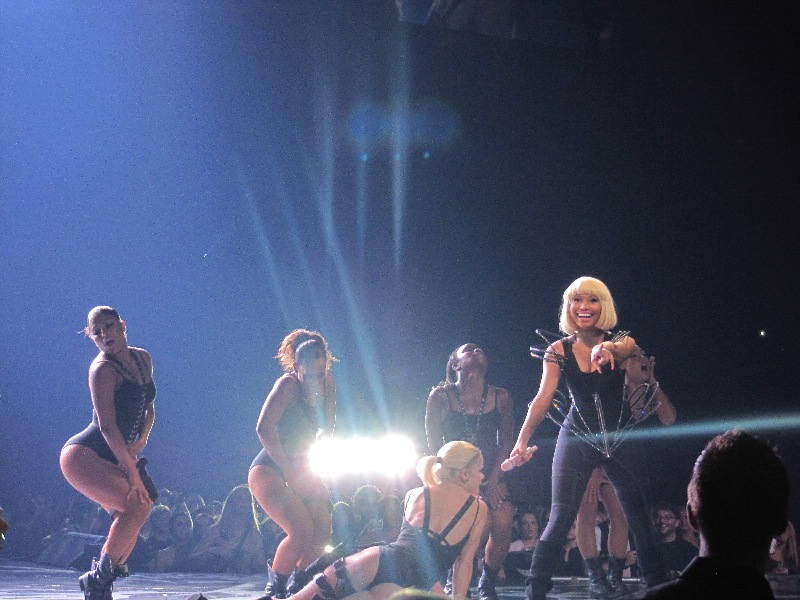
Performer Nicki Minaj in concert. Minaj has been described as a video vixen - a female model who appears in hip-hop-oriented music videos.

Hip-hop is a traditionally male-dominated genre in which critics argue authenticity has frequently been identified with masculinity. This creates one of many barriers that women artists typically face when entering the hip-hop world, leading to some experiencing hostility towards them for their sex and marginalization. Hostility over their sex was largely unreciprocated until the recent adoption of personas of independent women and use of their sexuality as a form of sexual liberation by performers such as Lauryn Hill, Erykah Badu, Missy Elliott, Eve, Beyoncé, and Mary J. Blige.

Some critics such as Danyell Smith have observed that in order to succeed, female or women performers have to fulfill an overly sexualized or masculine image in order to be marketable in hip-hop, as many executives, producers, and listeners appear to prefer men's versions of reality. Feminist Robin Roberts has argued that artists like Nicki Minaj make easy targets for misogyny due to songs such as "Stupid Hoe", while other critics have referenced artists like Lil' Kim, Eve, Missy Elliott, Mia X, Gangsta Boo, Foxy Brown, Da Brat, Rah Digga, and Trina, who often refer to themselves and other women as "bitches", "hoes", and "gold diggers".

Musicians who present a masculine persona like Young M.A will often perform songs along the lines of "Ooouuu" that place her in the male role with the lyrics "I don't open doors for a whore / I just want the neck, nothin' more" and "I ride for my guys, that's the bro code." A 2011 content analysis of music videos found that sexual objectification of women occurs not only in the music videos of male artists, but also female or woman artists. Female or woman rappers and R&B artists were found to particularly self-objectify, a finding consistent with objectification theory.

American academic Tricia Rose has argued that female rappers, most of whom are black, may find it difficult to condemn the misogyny of male rappers out of a need to collectively oppose racism and a desire to not contribute to the stereotype that black masculinity is "pathological". Rebollo-Gil and Moras have further contended a failure by black female rappers to provide a blanket defense of both rap music and the genre's misogyny is often "interpreted as treason by their black male counterparts and could possibly harm their career".

The media outlet Feministing has argued that the artists Nicki Minaj, Young M.A and others like them are victims of an industry that makes millions off of disrespecting and objectifying women. Author Cheryl L. Keyes has suggested that women in the industry rarely get the opportunity to express empowering messages because in order to enter into rap and hip-hop as performers and to compete with male rappers they must follow what Keyes calls "male rules". Female or woman rap and hip-hop artists must, according to Keyes, embody the male aesthetic and emulate male behavior in order to gain the attention of predominantly male record producers. Similarly, sociologist Patricia Hill Collins has argued that female performers must follow certain rules and even objectify themselves in order to be "accepted within this Black male-controlled universe."

In their book Gender Talk Johnnetta Cole and Beverly Guy-Sheftall have suggested that the objectification of African American women could potentially have historical roots in that historically African American women's bodies were "used as a breeding ground for the reproduction of a slave population" and were also used as a means of pleasure to white slave owners. They offer that African American women have always been a very vulnerable part of society, and that it is being reflected in gangsta rap music.

Some commentators have noted an increase in songs with empowering themes among female rappers. For example, the viral 2020 song “I Am” by rappers Flo Milli and Baby Tate is an ode to self-confidence and independence. The lyrics: “I am protected, well respected, I'm a queen, I'm a dream (Yeah), I do what I wanna do, And I'm who I wanna be” iterate this message, as well as signify a cultural shift in the hip-hop industry related to more positive self-expression in women (Xian, 2024).

=== Male hip-hop artists ===
Many male rappers, especially those labeled as political hip-hop artists, have condemned misogyny in hip-hop. In "Assata's Song" from his 1992 album Sleeping with the Enemy, the artist Paris criticizes misogyny, rapping about how women deserve respect. A music video for the song was released on the YouTube channel of Paris's label Guerrilla Funk Records.

Immortal Technique has also condemned sexism numerous times. The track "Crossing the Boundary," from his 2003 album Revolutionary Vol. 2, begin with the line, "I never make songs that disrespect women". In 2010, at the Rock the Bells hip-hop festival in New York he condemned misogyny on stage by stating: "Your mother, your sister, your grandmother, the girl you came here with tonight, or the woman you're going to marry someday, she might have lost her virginity by being a victim of rape ... and she might never tell you. You poor bastards might never know, and it's because women are prouder than men, and every time we've been made slaves, it's only with the help of our women that we have risen up and fought oppression of every single kind." The same year, Canadian rapper Shad released the song "Keep Shining" where he talks about the positive influence women have had on his life and the need for hip-hop to have more female or woman MCs.

British hip-hop artists Lowkey and Akala have consistently avoided misogynistic lyrics from their music and chosen to sing about female empowerment instead; with Lowkey rapping, "So think about that stuff when you diss her; That's somebody's daughter, somebody's mother and somebody's sister" in the song Something Wonderful; and Akala rapping, "And I ain't diss black women to make my livin'" in Fire in the Booth Part IV.

Some artists, such as Horrorcore rapper Necro, have released songs and videos that critique misogyny in hip-hop, which can be seen as taking a stand against such behavior.

Other rappers, such as Tupac, leave a complex legacy, sometimes playing into misogynistic themes, yet also producing music that affirms the worth of black women, in songs such as "Keep Ya Head Up" and "Dear Mama".

Political hip-hop is a subgenre of hip-hop music that was developed in the 1980s as a way of turning rap music into a call for action and a form of social activism. South African rap and hip-hop music artist Pope Troy, often uses examples of political ideologues that tend to become relevant due to the use of stereotype misogynist ideals, to decry sexism and exploitation of children through the use of hyper-sexualized campaign content.

=== Youth listeners ===
According to Gourdine and Lemmons' study, "Perceptions of Misogyny in Hip Hop and Rap: What Do the Youths Think?", the youth population is highly affected and involved in the hip-hop and rap music industry. Individuals from ages 18–24 spend a majority of their time listening to this type of music, so researchers Gourdine and Lemmons conducted this study and found that it was easier to understand youth's perceptions on misogyny by focusing on their listening habits and age. When first conducting this research, it was difficult for youth to express their opinions due to the fact that they already had a preconceived notion that adults did not support rap music, "the youths expressed concern that there were different genres of hip-hop and rap music and that one needed to understand the history of those artists who fell into what they termed conscious and unconscious categorizations".

The youth admitted that, "Even those youths who embrace the lifestyle agree that the media sensationalizes a way of living that can do harm to their communities" (Brown & Gourdine, 1998, 2001, 2007). After conducting a study amongst 262 individuals in an undergraduate college, the researchers revealed that the youth, "who listened to rap and hip-hop music less frequently were more likely to have negative perceptions of and attitudes toward the music, and those who listened more frequently were more likely to have positive perceptions and attitudes ... That is, the younger group (18- to 20-year-olds) reported significantly greater scores on the violent-misogyny subscale indicating more positive perceptions and attitudes toward rap and hip-hop music than the older group (21- to 23-year-olds)".

This study came to the conclusion that the younger the individuals listening to this rap and hip-hop music, the more likely they did not identify the misogyny that came with this type of music. According to Gourdine and Lemmons, the older the individuals are, the more likely they are mature and disidentify with the harsh words and misogyny against women in rap music. Gourdine and Lemmons suggest that in order to improve the youth's understanding of rap music we must, "[monitor] the amount of time spent listening to music, which gives youths other alternatives. This study indicates that the younger the youths, the more likely they will listen to rap. This population is college-age, and the maturity factor may have affected the findings in this study. A study looking at younger youths is needed. The opportunity to analyze the music can be useful as well".

== See also ==
- C. Delores Tucker
- Video vixen
- Sexuality in music videos
- Stop Murder Music
- Hip-hop culture
- Hip-hop feminism
- Homophobia in hip-hop culture
- Stereotypes of African Americans
- Hypermasculinity
- Double consciousness
- Sexism in heavy metal music
