= Joan Morgan (American author) =

American author and journalist

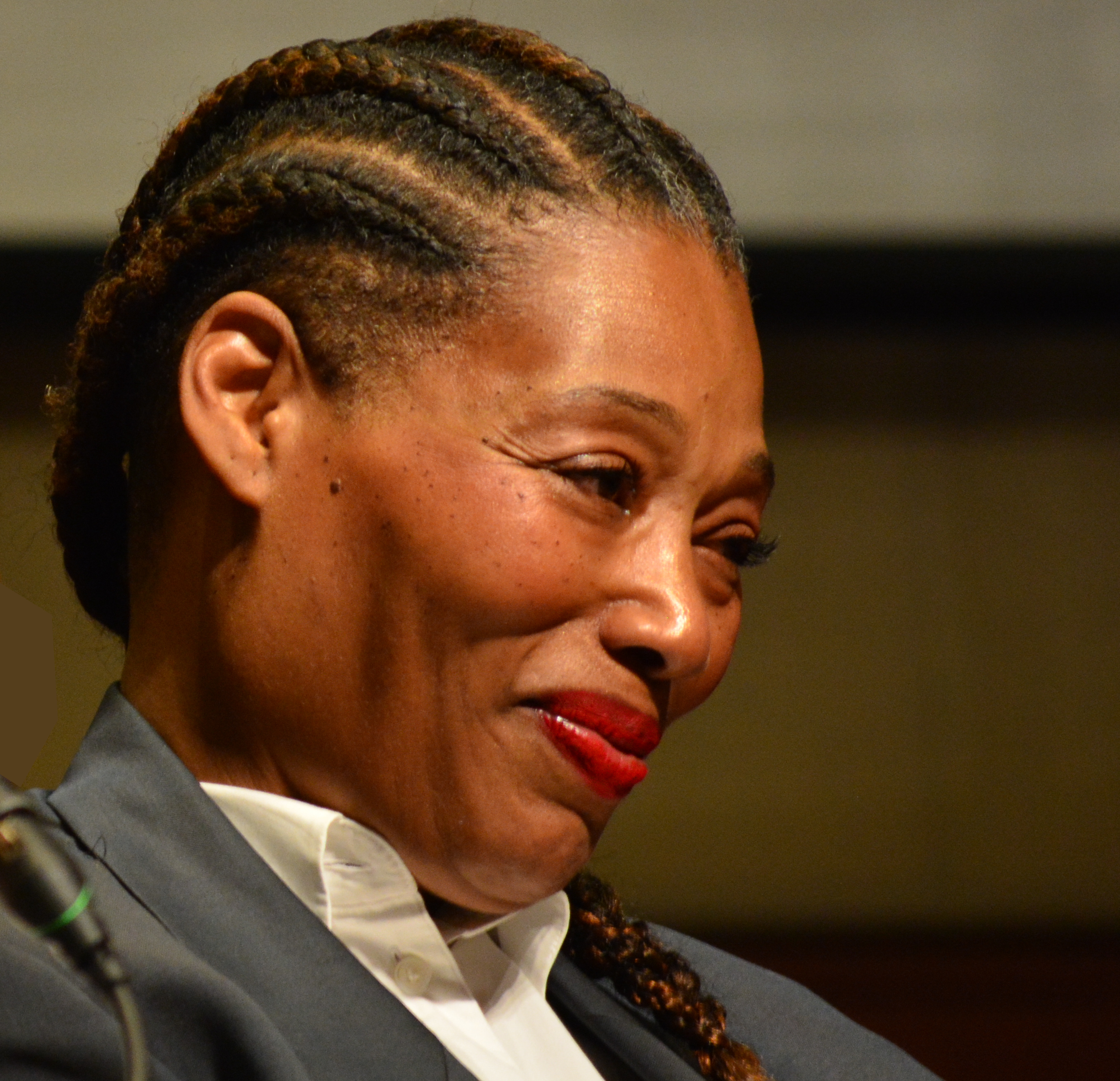
- Morgan in 2025
- Born: May 25, 1965 (age 61); Westmoreland Parish, Jamaica
- Education: Wesleyan University; New York University
- Occupations: Author; Journalist
- Years active: 1993-present

Joan Morgan (born May 25, 1965) is a Jamaican-American author and journalist. She was born in Jamaica and raised in the South Bronx, New York City. Morgan coined the term "hip hop feminist".

== Early life and education ==
Morgan was born in Westmoreland Parish, Jamaica, where her father was one of the founders of the Jamaica Labour Party and later was president of the Jamaican Freedom League in the Bronx. In 1968, she moved to the South Bronx neighborhood of the Bronx when she was two years old. Her father worked at Montefiore Medical Center in security and her mother, Maud Morgan, worked at Montefiore as a nurse, also teaching at the community center, Clermont Center.

Morgan went to the elementary school, PS 2, on Fulton Avenue, then to junior high on 148th on Washington Avenue. During that time she went to the Clermont Center in the Clermont projects. In 1979, Morgan went to the Ethical Culture Fieldston School in the Bronx, where she had previously attended a summer school enrichment program. She graduated from Fieldston in 1983.

In 1987, Morgan received a B.A. degree from Wesleyan University. During this time she went to Howard University for a semester. She was a Scholar in Residence at Vanderbilt University. In 2020, Morgan received a PhD in American Studies from New York University. Her dissertation, It's About Time We Got Off: Claiming a Pleasure Politic in Black Feminist Thought, was published thereafter. Her advisor was Jennifer L. Morgan.

== Career ==
Morgan has been a freelance journalist since 1988. She has worked at SPIN as a columnist and as an editor. Morgan has written articles for Working Mother, More, Ms., Interview, and GIANT magazines.

Morgan began her journalism career at The Village Voice, where one of her early articles, The Pro-Rape Culture, was about the Central Park jogger case. In 1991, Morgan covered the Mike Tyson rape trial for The Village Voice. Morgan received an Excellence Merit Award from the National Women's Political Caucus.

From 1993 to 1996, Morgan was an original staff writer for Vibe Media Group's Vibe magazine.

In 1999, Morgan coined the phrases "Black girl magic" and "hip hop feminist" through her groundbreaking book When Chickenheads Come Home to Roost.

From 2000 to 2002, Morgan was the executive editor of Essence magazine.

From 2008 to 2010, Morgan was the editorial director of SET Magazine.

In 2012, Morgan participated in a 12-city panel tour series called "Does Hip-Hop Hate Women", which was held at college campuses across the country at Brown University, Dillard University, Harvard Law School, Spelman College, and the University of Chicago among others. Panelists included local hosts and a rotating group that included Bakari Kitwana, Mark Anthony Neal, Treva Lindsey, Marc Lamont Hill, Akiba Solomon, Byron Hurt, and Tracey Sharpley Whiting among others.

In the Winter of 2013, she taught a class at Stanford University titled "The Pleasure Principle: A Post-Hip Hop Search for a Black Feminist Politics of Pleasure". Morgan was also an instructor at Ethical Culture Fieldston School, The New School, Duke University, and Vanderbilt University.

Morgan appeared in the 2020 documentary On the Record, about rape accusations against hip-hop mogul Russell Simmons.

== Books ==
=== When Chickenheads Come Home to Roost ===
Morgan's most famous work is found in her 1999 book When Chickenheads Come Home to Roost, in which she examines the complexities of feminism for women who have grown up with hip hop. She examines the perceived hypocrisies in being a feminist woman who supports black male-centric movements like Farrakhan's Million Man March and hip-hop - which she argues has many male-centric elements. She explores the dynamic of ascribing to feminism while simultaneously enjoying some aspects of patriarchal culture, focusing on how one balances and reconciles these seemingly conflicting ideas.

She asks herself questions such as "Can you be a good feminist and admit out loud that there are things that you kinda dig about patriarchy?" and "Suppose you don't want to pay for your own dinner, hold the door open, fix things, move furniture, or get intimate with whatever's under the hood of a car"? She additionally cites music artists such as R. Kelly, Jodeci, Lil' Kim, and Queen Latifah as vehicles through which she makes her point about some of the dualities that come with feminism.

=== She Begat This: 20 Years of The Miseducation of Lauryn Hill ===
In 2018, Morgan published the book, She Begat This: 20 Years of The Miseducation of Lauryn Hill, which The Paris Review called a cultural history of Lauryn Hill's 1998 debut album The Miseducation of Lauryn Hill, 20 years after the record's release.

== Personal life ==
Morgan has a son.

== Awards ==
- National Woman's Political Caucus, Excellence Merit Media Award (EMMA) for Mike Tyson trial coverage
- 2013: Stanford University, Dr. St. Clair Drake Award for Outstanding Teaching for the course "The Pleasure Principle"

== Selected works and publications ==
=== Selected works ===
- Morgan, Joan (1999). When Chickenheads Come Home to Roost: My Life As a Hip-Hop Feminist. New York, NY: Simon & Schuster. ISBN 978-0-684-82262-4. OCLC 246337979.
- Morgan, Joan; Cooper, Brittney (foreword by); Lindsey, Treva B. (afterword by) (2017). When Chickenheads Come Home to Roost: A Hip-Hop Feminist Breaks It Down (New ed.). New York, NY: Simon & Schuster. ISBN 978-0-684-86861-5. OCLC 1018087707.
- Morgan, Joan (2018). She Begat This: 20 Years of The Miseducation of Lauryn Hill. New York, NY: 37 Ink/Atria, Simon & Schuster. ISBN 978-1-501-19525-9. OCLC 1041212001.
- Morgan, Joan (2020). It's About Time We Got Off: Claiming a Pleasure Politic in Black Feminist Thought (PhD). New York University.

=== Selected publications ===
- Morgan, Joan (9 May 1989). "The Pro-Rape Culture". The Village Voice. pp. 39–40.
- Kennedy, Lisa; West, Cornel; Morgan, Joan; Wood, Joe; Lester, Julius; Tate, Greg; Wallace, Michele; hooks, bell; Stewart, Frank (photographs by) (17 September 1991). "Black Like Who? Notes on African American Identity". The Village Voice. pp. 32–33, 36, 38. Archived from the original on June 28, 2020.
- Morgan, Joan (3 March 1992). "A Blackwoman's Guide to the Tyson Trial". The Village Voice. pp. 37–.
- Morgan, Joan (13 February 1996). "Fly-Girls, Bitches, Hos: Notes From a Hip-Hop Feminist". The Village Voice. pp. 32–33.
- Morgan, Joan (August 1997). "Baby's Mama". Essence. pp. 84–86.
- Morgan, Joan (1 December 1998). "Give It Up!". The Village Voice. Archived from the original on September 16, 2018.
- Morgan, Joan (Winter 2015). "Why We Get Off: Moving Towards a Black Feminist Politics of Pleasure". The Black Scholar. 45 (4 - On the Future of Black Feminism). Taylor & Francis, Ltd.: 36–46. doi:10.1080/00064246.2015.1080915. JSTOR 24803042. S2CID 143330163.
