= Carroll Seron =

American sociologist

Carroll Seron is an American sociologist and Professor of Criminology, Law & Society at the University of California, Irvine (UCI). Her research focuses on legal organizations and professions. She has also studied gender disparities in engineering employment, arguing that they are due to gender bias in stereotypes and engineering culture.

== Education and career ==
Seron received her B.A. in American studies from the University of California, Santa Cruz in 1970, followed by an M.A. (1974) and Ph.D. (1976) from New York University, both in sociology. She joined the faculty of UCI as a full professor in 2005, prior to which she had been on faculty at the CUNY Graduate Center as chair of its program in sociology. From 2011 to 2012, she was a visiting professor at Flinders University and the Institute of Advanced Legal Studies. From 2012 to 2014, she was the chair of UCI's Chair of the Department of Criminology, Law and Society, of which she served as Interim Dean from 2015 to 2016. She was the editor-in-chief of Law & Society Review for its 42nd, 43rd, and 44th volumes. With her UCI colleague Charis Kubrin, she co-edited a special issue of the Annals of the American Academy of Political and Social Science.

== Positions in learned societies ==
Seron was the chair of the American Sociological Association's Sociology of Law Section from 2008 to 2009, and served as president of the Law and Society Association from 2014 to 2015.
