= Chickenhead (sexual slang) =

American English slang term

Chickenhead is an American English slang term that is typically used in a derogatory manner toward women. The term mocks the motion of the head while performing oral sex on a man, but contains social characteristics and cultural relevance as well, and is frequently heard in popular hip hop music. "Chickenhead" is also a term used in overseas sex trafficking for individuals that facilitate and monitor a person's transition into sex work.

== Etymology ==
The word, a chiefly American colloquial term, is usually written "chicken head" or "chicken-head", according to the Oxford English Dictionary, which has 1903 for a first recorded use meaning "foolish or stupid person". It cites John Steinbeck's East of Eden (1952) for its earliest use as a "refer[ence] to prostitutes". A secondary meaning, first recorded in 1988, is "U.S. derogatory slang (esp. in African American usage)", used to refer to "a sexually promiscuous woman" or a woman in general.

A chickenhead in the transnational sex trade is typically responsible for facilitating transportation, acquiring temporary lodging, and monitoring activities of the new sex worker, similar to the activities of a pimp.

== Derogatory and empowering ==
Ronald Weitzer and Charis Kubrin note that "A favorite rap term is 'chickenhead,' which reduces a woman to a bobbing head giving oral sex." Bakari Kitwana argues that many rappers refer to women, black women in particular, with demeaning terms names such as "bitches, gold diggers, hoes, hoodrats, chickenheads, pigeons, and so on." Johnnetta B. Cole argues that hip hop's tradition to refer to black women in such terms disrespects and vilifies them.

In Joan Morgan's When Chickenheads Come Home to Roost, she notes the derogatory tendency of the term "chickenhead", and further defines it as a woman who uses sex to achieve the things she wants. As a black, hip-hop feminist, Morgan offers that chickenheads simply use the tools afforded to them when other means are not efficient, and that all women may have something to learn from the use of sexual power.

== See also ==
- Misogyny in rap music

== Bibliography ==
- Morgan, Joan (1999). When chickenheads come home to roost: my life as a hip-hop feminist. New York: Simon & Schuster. ISBN 9780684822624.
- Bulbeck, Chilla (2000). "Young feminist voices on the future of feminism". Sociological Sites/Sights, TASA 2000 Conference, (6-8 December). Adelaide: Flinders University.
- Springer, Kimberly (Summer 2002). "Third wave Black feminism?". Signs. 27 (4): 1059–1082. doi:10.1086/339636. JSTOR 10.1086/339636. S2CID 143519056.
- Massey, Carla (1996). "Body-smarts: an adolescent girl thinking, talking, and mattering". Gender and Psychoanalysis. 1. Psychoanalytic Electronic Publishing (PEP): 75–102.
- Stephens, Dionne P.; Phillips, Layli D. (March 2003). "Freaks, gold diggers, divas, and dykes: The sociohistorical development of adolescent African American women's sexual scripts". Sexuality & Culture. 7 (1): 3–49. doi:10.1007/BF03159848. S2CID 143036176.
