= Brittney Cooper =

Black feminist scholar, author, activist and pundit

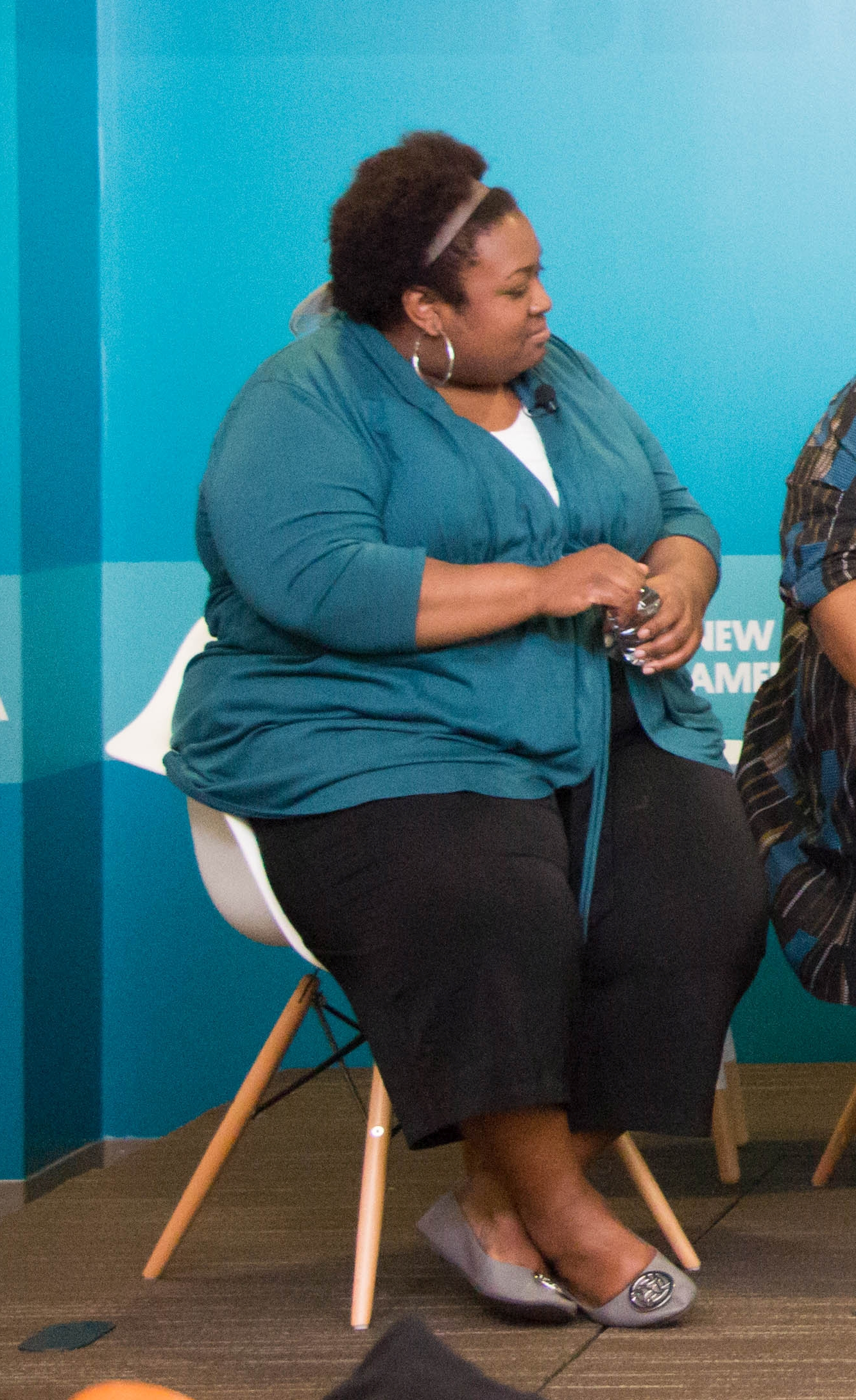
- Cooper in 2017
- Born: Ruston, Louisiana, U.S.
- Education: Howard University (BA); Emory University (MA, PhD)
- Occupations: Author, pundit, cultural critic
- Employer: Rutgers University, New Brunswick

Brittney Cooper is an American academic author, activist, and cultural critic. She is a professor of women’s, gender, and sexuality studies and Africana studies, and the principal investigator and founding director of the Race and Gender Equity Lab at Rutgers University–New Brunswick.

== Biography ==
Cooper is from Ruston, Louisiana. She is currently a professor of women's and gender studies and Africana studies at Rutgers University–New Brunswick, and the principal investigator and founding director of the Race and Gender Equity Lab. She is a co-founder of the Crunk Feminist Collective and co-editor of the collection of essays of the same title, which explore intersectionality, African-American culture, and hip-hop feminism.

Her areas of research and work include black women's organizations, black women intellectuals, and hip-hop feminism. In 2013 and 2014, she was named to The Root's Root 100, an annual list of top Black influencers.

During a discussion on white supremacy and power, Cooper stated that white people are historically and in the aggregate "committed to being villains" and "spiritually bankrupt about power," adding, "we got to take these motherf–kers out" while immediately clarifying that she did not mean a project of physical violence. She also remarked on declining birth rates among white populations.

== Publications ==
Cooper's first book was Beyond Respectability: The Intellectual Thought of Race Women, published in 2017 by University of Illinois Press. A book review from National Public Radio (NPR) called Beyond Respectability "a work of crucial cultural study." The book won the 2018 Merle Curti Prize for Best Book in U.S. Intellectual History from the Organization of American Historians.

Cooper also co-authored and edited The Crunk Feminist Collection (published in 2017 by The Feminist Press at City University of New York) along with Susana M. Morris and Robin M. Boylorn. The book collection received positive acclaim from Publishers Weekly, Kirkus Reviews, Literary Hub, and Ebony. The collection is a series of essays that originated on the blog The Crunk Feminist Collective, which Cooper co-founded.

In 2018, her book Eloquent Rage: A Black Feminist Discovers Her Superpower was published by St. Martin's Press. In it, Cooper explores black feminism and anger, specifically the anger of black women, as a basis for revolutionary action. Kirkus Reviews praised the writing, calling it "Sharp and always humane, Cooper’s book suggests important ways in which feminism needs to evolve for the betterment not just of black women, but society as a whole."

== Books ==
- The Crunk Feminist Collection (2017) ISBN 1558619437
- Beyond Respectability: The Intellectual Thought of Race Women (2017) ISBN 0252082486
- Eloquent Rage: A Black Feminist Discovers Her Superpower (2018) ISBN 1250112575

== See also ==
- Ratchet feminism
