= Crunk Feminist Collection =

2017 book

- Editor: Brittney Cooper, Susana M. Morris and Robin M. Boylorn
- Publisher: Feminist Press
- Publication date: 2017

The Crunk Feminist Collection is a collection of essays that take on intersectionality, African-American culture, patriarchy, misogyny, anti-blackness and hip hop feminism. The essays were originally published on the blog Crunk Feminist Collective between 2010 and 2015. Edited by Brittney Cooper, Susana M. Morris and Robin M. Boylorn, three members of the Crunk Feminist Collective (CFC), the book was published in 2017 by Feminist Press.

Along with section introductions written by the editors to organize and frame some of the themes addressed, the collection includes popular essays from the blog written by CFC members Crunkista, Sheri Davis-Faulkner, Aisha Durham, Eesha Pandit, Rachel Raimist and Chanel Craft Tanner.

== Reception ==
Publishers Weekly described the essays as "extremely relevant, educational, and a genuine pleasure to wrestle with", while Literary Hub listed the collection as a "required book" for Women's History Month, and Ebony included it among "powerful must-reads". Kirkus Reviews considered it "(a) valuable record of (...) a growing cultural awareness of feminist issues and criticism, particularly for women of color", but faulted the contributors for "favor(ing) anecdotal evidence rather than a more substantive argument.

== See also ==
- Misogynoir
- Misogyny in rap music
