= Misogynoir =

Term for a type of misogyny toward black women

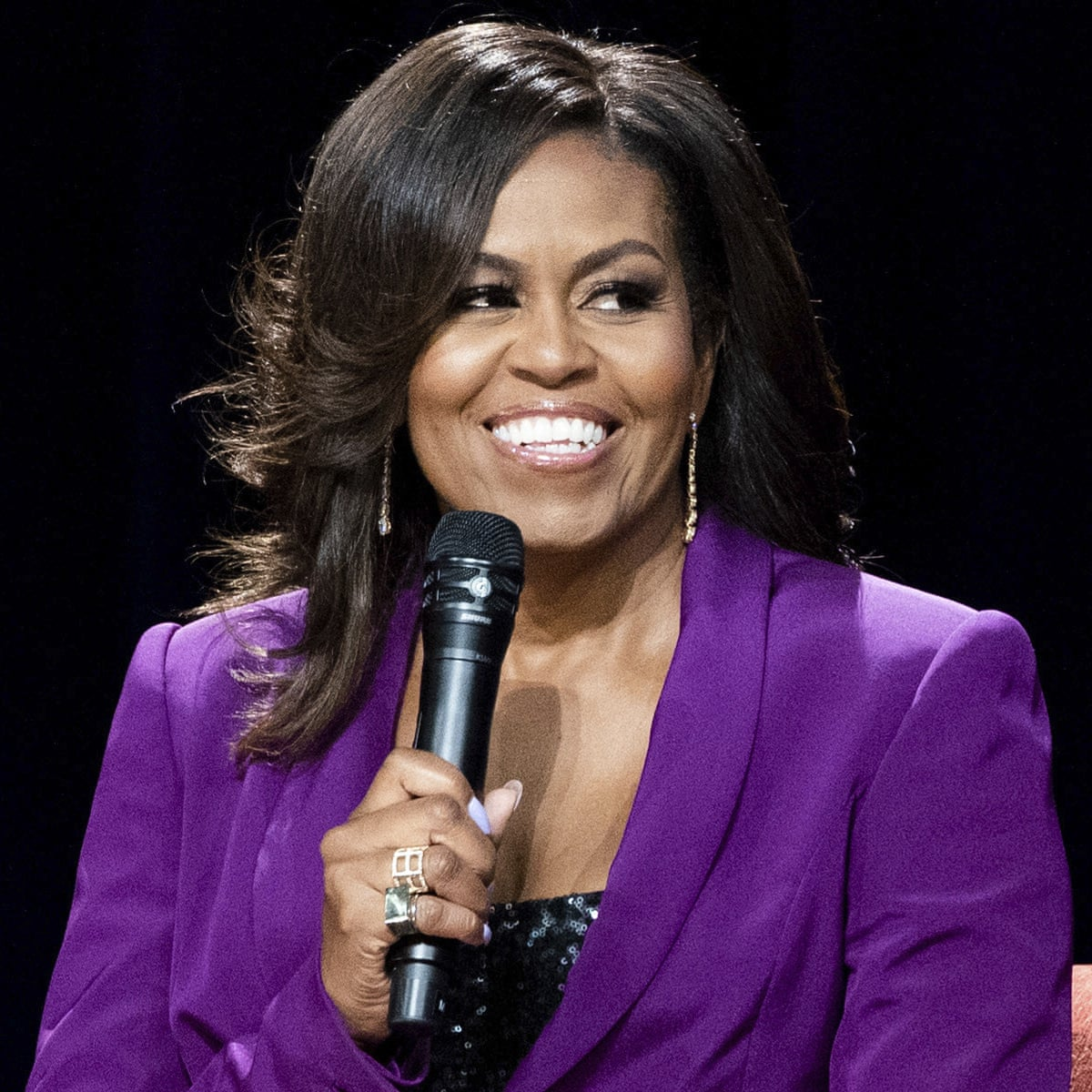
Michelle Obama has been the subject of misogynoir.

Misogynoir is a term referring to the combined force of anti-black racism and misogyny directed towards black women. The term was coined by black feminist writer Moya Bailey in 2008 to address misogyny directed toward Black transgender and cisgender women in American visual and popular culture. The concept of misogynoir is grounded in the theory of intersectionality, which analyzes how various social identities such as race, gender, class, age, ability, and sexual orientation interrelate in systems of oppression.

== Development of concept ==
Bailey coined the term "misogynoir" while she was a graduate student at Emory University (Note: Bailey first used the term in a 2010 essay for the blog "Crunk Feminist Collective" titled "They Aren't Talking About Me...".) to discuss anti-black misogyny in rap music. It combines the terms "misogyny," the hatred of women, and "noir," the French word for "black," to denote what Bailey describes as the unique form of anti-black misogyny faced by black women, particularly in visual and digital culture. Bailey and co-author Whitney Peoples describe the elements of their neologism, misogynoir, as:

a combination of misogyny, 'the hatred of women', and noir, which means 'black' but also carries film and media connotations. It is the particular amalgamation of anti-Black racism and misogyny in popular media and culture that targets Black trans and cis women.

The concept of misogynoir was elaborated on in a 2014 essay by Trudy of the blog "Gradient Lair", and has been accepted and used by many black feminists and cultural critics, especially in the blogosphere. The concept has emboldened black women to break through cultures of silence and anti-racist protectiveness that shield black men's investments in patriarchy, toxic masculinities, and sexist violence.

Trans women of color experience violence at a greater rate than cisgender women of color or white trans women. The term "transmisogynoir" was created to refer to the intersection between transmisogyny and misogynoir, meaning the oppression of black trans women. Transmisogynoir comprises transphobia, misogyny, and anti-blackness. It was coined by Trudy of the womanist blog Gradient Lair.

== History ==
Misogynoir started from the period of enslavement in the west and the reinforcement of caste and gender positionings of white supremacy ideology. This was enforced by white male supremacy. During this period, the set of anti Black women archetypes were formed. These were made to set the place for Black women in an hierarchy system as subservient, oddities, sexual objects, troublesome and amusements. These became codified into western society. In present media, the misogynistic tropes retained their core concepts, but adapted to match the times. Studies show that Black Women in America are subject to more abuse and harassment online than other groups.

== Application ==
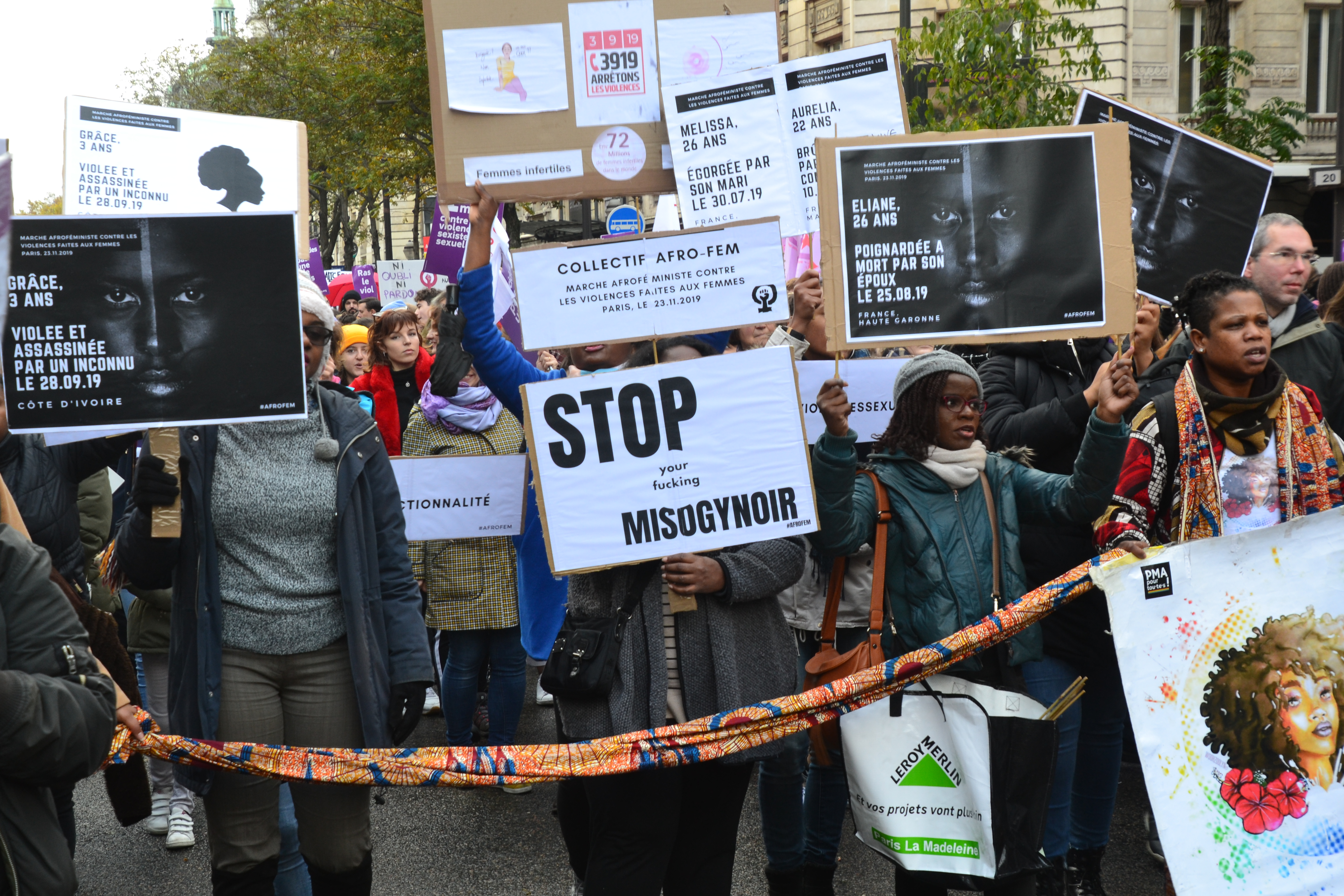
Protest against misogynoir in Paris

Though misogynoir can be perpetrated by anyone, the term most often refers to the misogyny experienced by black women at the hands of black men. As the plight of the black man in America remains at the forefront of society, black feminist work and the issues facing African-American women are erased and ignored. In a foreword to an edition of Michele Wallace's book "Black Macho and the Myth of the Superwoman," Jamilah Lemieux writes that misogynoir "can come even from those who are black, who were raised by black women and profess to value black people."

For example, the Black Lives Matter movement, created in 2012, was founded by three black women: Alicia Garza, Opal Tometi, and Patrisse Cullors. Nevertheless, this is little known throughout the wider community, and while the movement specifically states it advocates for the lives of the entire black community, protests, and activist groups invoking the #BlackLivesMatter hashtag and mission are disproportionately rallying cries for justice on behalf of African American men. Incidences where police wrongfully kill or assault black women (as well as transgender, non-binary, and gender non-conforming black people) receive significantly less attention, as evidenced by the lack of media attention surrounding the 2015 case of Officer Daniel Holtzclaw who used his authority to prey on and assault upwards of 13 black women.

On a broader scale, misogynoir is also characterized by the tropes projected onto black women. Some of these common stereotypes include the "Strong Black Woman" and the hypersexual "Jezebel." In her article "4 Tired Tropes That Perfectly Explain What Misogynoir Is – And How You Can Stop It", Kisiena Boom describes these common tropes and why they are damaging. For example, while the "Strong Black Woman" stereotype seems to be complimentary, it ignores the racialized physical and mental trauma that black women have had to endure.

Perpetuating the idea that black women can handle anything justifies the situations African American women are forced into, such as the "Mammy" role for white families, the heteronormative head of household when black men are lost to the prison-industrial complex, and sexual abuse. This justification eliminates the need and desire to rectify the real problems. Furthermore, this trope forces black women to bury their issues and put on a "strong" face for those who expect it. However, existing hate speech detection tools are ineffective at recognizing the nuanced contexts of misogynoir, often leading to misclassification and further harm to black women.

Some further applications of misogynoir can be assessed through the use of unfair and unjust assumptions of women, particularly women of color, is the practice of doctors, or other physicians, refusing certain safe practices to black women because they are believed to possess higher pain tolerance.

== Music ==
Misogynoir has been cited by scholars to address black sexual politics in hip-hop music and culture at large. Respectability politics is one such issue. Coined by Evelyn Brooks Higginbotham, the term "respectability politics" refers to the tactics black people employ to promote racial uplift and obtain broader access to the public sphere.

Misogynoir is shown in the lyrics and videos released to promote popular songs and better publicize certain songs. In recent years, it was found that music had more sexual content than any other media outlet. In hip-hop music, black women are often depicted as only being good for abuse or sex. These videos and lyrics reflect the way society sees black women and their bodies. Music videos are important because they are a way to better publicize hit songs, especially on television. Television shows became significant because they aired music videos. Examples of these are BET, MTV, and VH1.

=== Intersectionality ===
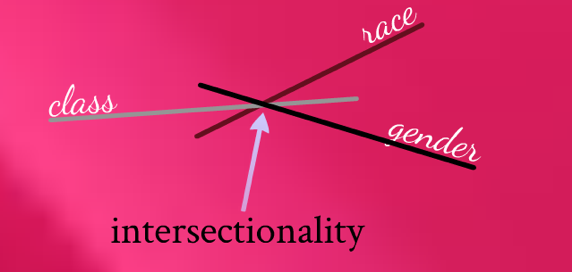
Example of three intersecting categories.

Intersectionality is an analysis of different identities people can have. Misogynoir is used to describe the discrimination against those who have the intersection of being black and a woman. Intersectionality has an effect on all types of human society, and the music industry is no exception. Black women have not and continue to have a smaller hold in the music industry and its many genres including jazz, hip hop, R&B, contemporary, country, and popular music. Male and light-skinned artists dominate these genres, and are the norm for the music industry. An article of The Guardian mentions artists like Alicia Keys, Rihanna, Nicki Minaj, Mariah Carey, and Beyoncé are prominent in popular music. These women challenge the norm of male domination in the music industry, but do not challenge the tendency towards light-skinned artists – colorism – as they are ones themselves.

=== Rap ===
The rap industry consists mostly of male artists who face less criticism than black female artists. Many black women artists have come forward with accounts of being sexually abused by DJ Tim Westwood, and allegations were formed in May 2022. A popular figure in the black music industry, Westwood was able to get away with the alleged abuse due to the stifling of black women's voices in the industry.

=== Hip-hop ===
The cultural modes of hip-hop are part of the black cultural ethos and can be read as markers of black ways of being. Hip-hop was and continues to be a culture that cannot disassociate from the complexity that defines the black experience in America. The music and culture of hip-hop were once an organic stylization and artistic expression for black people at the margins of society. However, certain elements of the hip-hop culture, namely the violent, criminal, and hyper-sexualized expressions of black people, are the only form of the genre to be mass-produced. The reality TV program Love & Hip Hop: New York is an example of showing the biases created by hip-hop against black people. This program is targeted at youth culture and broadcast on networks, so it functions as a "powerful source of socialization and ideological domination" through the representations and values conveyed by the program. It perpetuates stereotypes of people of color through the narrow lens of black masculinity and femininity.

==== Black women in hip-hop videos ====
Regardless of opportunities for diverse media representation, studies indicate that women in the videos of male artists, especially hip-hop or rap videos, are often portrayed as sexual and submissive; typically, multiple women are shown in provocative poses and revealing clothing and vying for the attention of the male artist or artists and their entourage. Feature videos by female artists similarly present women in subservient or oversexualized roles compared to the videos of male artists. The media and entertainment industries practice an "otherness" standard as it regards young black female artists; compared to white female artists of a similar age, the marketing of mainstream black artists is hypersexualized. Their sexual attractiveness and the exotic otherness of black women are emphasized more than their actual talent.

=== Representation ===
Due to the growing and changing ideas of the norm, black women have been able to rise in importance and popularity in the music industry. Artists like Megan Thee Stallion and Flo Milli have become icons in the rap industry. These artists have become people of empowerment for young black girls and show the growing representation in the music industry. Music videos are a way to listen to and watch artists perform online. While they further representation for black women, they also emphasize their sexuality and often include stereotypical "Black behavior." The growing representation of black women began in the 1990s with the hip-hop genre due to black males growing in popularity around that time. Christina Wheeler is a prominent black woman in the music industry and has voiced her and other artists' struggles in gaining respect and popularity. She voices that the amount of representation will grow if more black women were involved in not only performing but producing and working "behind the stage" as well. The Country genre of music, dominated by White artists and less by males, has also begun to show signs of black women representation.

=== Mass media ===
Mass media is a system that constructs a sense of reality through the transmission of news, advertising, and entertainment. Because the mass media operates as a system, its construction of reality is not arbitrary. It has observable operating patterns characterized by a simultaneous process of self and external reference. Mass media creates and disseminates information based on information it previously made (self-reference) and the context within which it is situated (external reference). In the case of Love & Hip Hop: New York, for example, the self-reference that the show draws upon are storylines in previous episodes (meant to keep viewers engaged with the cast) and externally, the show draws upon dominant characterizations of blackness in the media, popular trends in hip-hop, and the social, political, and economic circumstances of black people in the contemporary moment. The mass media obfuscates this extensive history by narrowing the diversity in hip-hop culture to stereotypical representations of black people—namely, that they are violent, greedy, and sexually irresponsible. Because of mass media, it is said that hip-hop culture has been commoditized and reduced to the perpetuation of representations of people of color that have long been deemed problematic. Advances in technology connected to the World Wide Web have provided access to a variety of web-based media resources, and the popularity of music videos and the mainstreaming of hip-hop music and African-American music artists have also increased the variety of personalities we see. The number of opportunities to see a wide variety of figures is increasing. Nevertheless, stereotypical images of African Americans persist.

==== Media socialization ====
Media socialization is an important factor that influences how youth come to acquire fixed or stereotypical self-representations and other representations. In the development and socialization of African American youth, it is a time when emotional and cognitive maturity is racing to catch up with the rapid pace of physical and hormonal changes. Due to a number of socio-economic factors, female African American pubertal onset, including breast development and menarche, typically occurs about a year before their white counterparts. Early-onset puberty complicates African American youth's understanding of gender roles and self-perceptions. Thus, for many black youth, early-onset puberty may cause others to respond to their adult-like appearance in ways that do not match their cognitive capacities or how they perceive themselves. In adolescence, youth openly nurse an emergent identity, wrestle with contradictory messages, and may experience shifts in their primary influence groups, which often include parents, peers, and siblings. During adolescence, black girls, like their peers, experience a surge in physical growth. However, the physical maturation of black girls often out-paces their same-gender peers. For many black girls, the metamorphosis involves pronounced physical features—fuller hips, rounded breasts and buttocks, and increased height that draws the attention of male peers and some adult men. Still children, some adolescent girls are unable or uncertain about how to manage the increased and different attention they are receiving. They must face challenges associated with puberty and negative perceptions about black women. African American young women receive messages about body image and self-esteem that are framed by the reality that beauty standards and roles traditionally relegated to white women do not apply to them. Modern images of beauty evolved from the historical ideals of womanhood; women are envisioned as white, meek, quiet, and slim. Black women are more likely to resist mainstream messages of beauty and instead rely on their cultural group's standards of beauty or, more recently, the hip-hop aesthetic, and they are passing these perspectives on to their children.

== Media ==
Serena Williams spoke with British Vogue about how she was, "underpaid (and) undervalued." Williams has been vocal about her treatment as a professional athlete in tennis. During the U.S. Open final in 2018, Williams was penalized for several things she challenged, including breaking her racket at the end of the fifth game against Naomi Osaka. This led to acting umpire Carlos Ramos giving Williams her second violation of the game. She was also accused of cheating and penalized, and when she asked for an apology, she did not receive one. She then asked for the tournament referee to weigh in. Her position was that male players had displayed similar actions and had often gone unpenalized, calling Ramos a "thief." Billie Jean King commended Williams for standing up via Twitter in a post.

It was partly due to this situation that Naomi Osaka rose to fame. Osaka was painted as a victim of Williams's actions in this game. The media painted Williams as an angry black woman and erased Osaka's blackness to enhance their perception of Williams as an aggressor in this situation. This is seen in a caricature published in the Australian Herald that depicts Williams with enhanced black features, similar to Jim Crow caricatures in the twentieth century, whereas Osaka is portrayed with lighter skin and straight hair, making her seem more "innocent" to the public, through the erasure of her blackness.

Commenting on the 2021 television interview "Oprah with Meghan and Harry," Bailey asserts that misogynoir negatively impacts all black women, regardless of skin color, wealth, class privilege, or their willingness to uphold the institutions that perpetuate misogynoir.

== Responses ==
Kimberlé Crenshaw (who coined the term intersectionality) created the #SayHerName campaign. Her goals have been to spread awareness to black women who have been killed by excessive police force. When she facilitates her symposiums, she mentions well-known victims of police brutality, who include Freddie Gray and Trayvon Martin. However, when she mentions Natasha McKenna and Aura Rosser, these women are almost unheard of.

Crenshaw has also partnered with the WNBA to further the goal of #SayHerName. On July 25, 2020, players wore jerseys with Breonna Taylor's name to spread awareness. Crenshaw provided the WNBA with a repository of female victims. This allowed for players to wear various names they felt more connected to. Crenshaw was able to provide these names through her co-founded organization, the African American Policy Forum.

The documentary "Say Her Name: The Life And Death Of Sandra Bland" acknowledges black women who are overlooked in police brutality and utilizes the #SayHerName tagline.

== See also ==
- African-American culture and sexual orientation
- Black feminism
- Gendered racism
- Kyriarchy
- Lynching of women in the United States
- Womanism
