= Moya Bailey =

African-American feminist scholar and activist

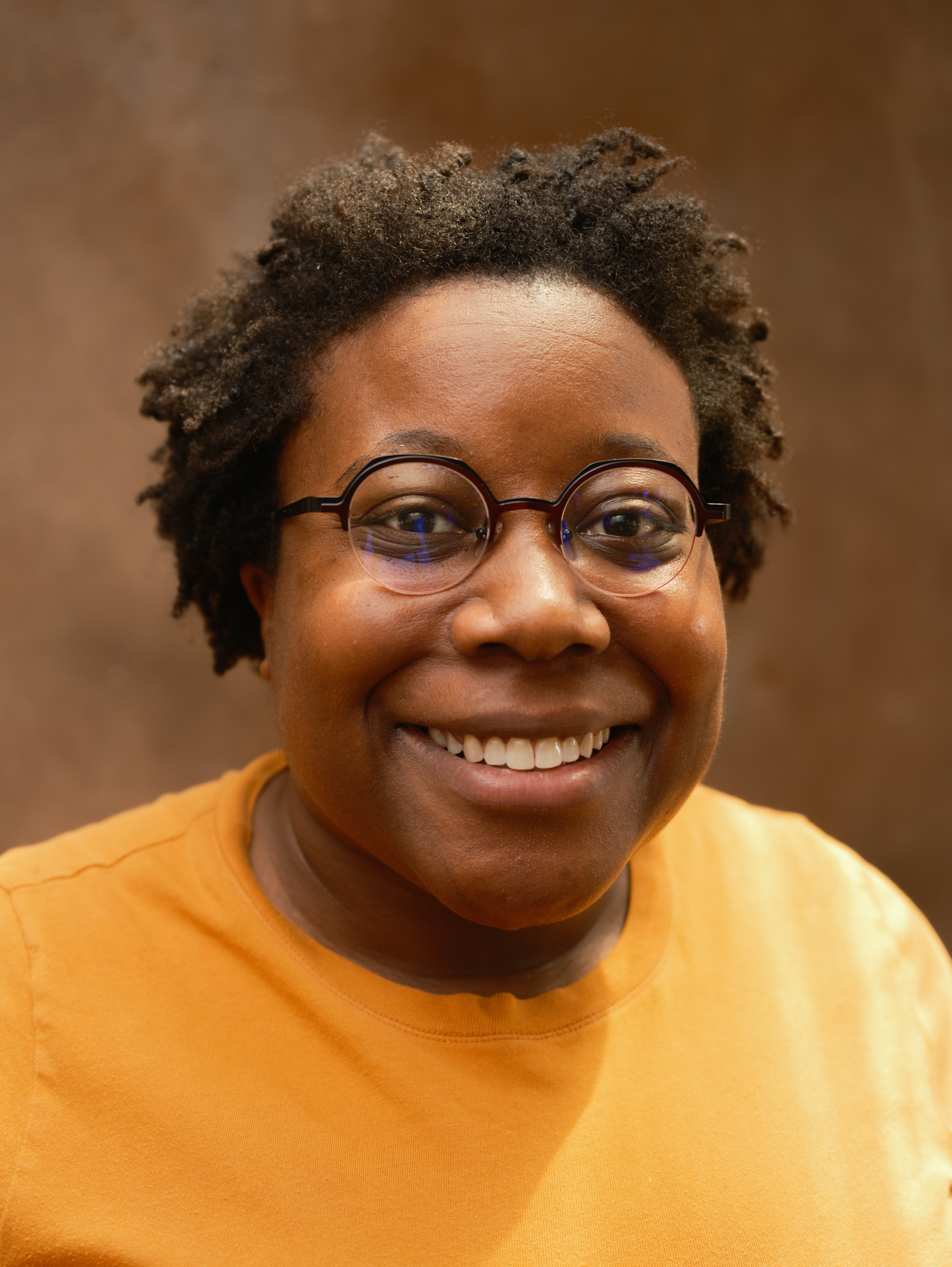
- Born: United States

Education
- Education: Spelman College; Emory University

Philosophical work
- Institutions: Southeastern Women's Studies Association; National Women's Studies Association; Octavia E. Butler Legacy Network
- Main interests: Feminist theory; Critical race theory; Disability studies; Intersectional feminism; Digital humanities; Queer theory; Sexuality studies; Media studies
- Notable ideas: Misogynoir

Moya Bailey is an African-American feminist scholar, writer, and activist. She is noted for coining the term misogynoir, which denotes what Bailey describes as the unique combination of misogyny and anti-black racism experienced by black women. Bailey is a professor at Northwestern University.

== Career ==
Bailey attended Spelman College for her undergraduate degree. She received her doctoral degree from Emory University in the department of Women, Gender, and Sexuality Studies. After working at Northeastern University as an assistant professor in the Department of Cultures, Societies, and Global Studies and the program in Women's, Gender, and Sexuality Studies, she joined the Department of Communication Studies at Northwestern.

She works with the Octavia E. Butler Legacy Network, "an organization that supports and promotes the writer's legacy," and is the co-founder of Quirky Black Girls, a collective for black women who do not fit cultural stereotypes. She also worked on the project #tooFEW. The hashtag "FEW" stands for "Feminists Engage Wikipedia". The objective of this project was to have feminists engage Wikipedia pages, both adding and editing information regarding individuals, events and things regarding feminism (with a particular focus on Black feminism). She received backlash and derogatory comments for taking part in this initiative.

== Misogynoir ==
Bailey originally coined the term misogynoir in 2008, but first used the term in a 2010 essay entitled "They aren't talking about me...". It is a portmanteau of the word misogyny and noir, the French word for 'black'. Bailey coined the term to describe a unique type of discrimination experienced by black women, specifically the "anti-Black racist misogyny that black women experience, particularly in US visual and digital culture." Since her initial creation of the term, she has elaborated further on the subject in a number of works, and the term has also been adopted by other scholars in fields such as gynecology, rhetoric and communications, and law.

In a 2014 blog post she wrote:

I was looking for precise language to describe why Renisha McBride would be shot in the face, or why The Onion would think it's okay to talk about Quvenzhané the way they did, or the hypervisibilty of Black women on reality TV, the arrest of Shanesha Taylor, the incarceration of CeCe, Laverne and Lupita being left off the TIME list, the continued legal actions against Marissa Alexander, the twitter dragging of black women with hateful hashtags and supposedly funny Instagram images as well as how Black women are talked about in music.

== Publications ==
- Misogynoir Transformed: Black Women's Digital Resistance. New York University Press. 2021. ISBN 978-1-4798-6510-9.
- “‘The Illest’: Disability as Metaphor in Hip Hop Music.” Everyday Women’s and Gender Studies: Introductory Concepts, 2016, pp. 36–40, doi:10.4324/9781315643205.
