= Charis Kubrin =

American criminologist and academic

- Education: Smith College (B.A.), University of Washington (M.A., Ph.D.)
- Spouse: Kevork Abazajian
- Children: One son
- Awards: (2005) Ruth Shonle Cavan Young Scholar Award from the American Society of Criminology (2014) Dean’s Diversity Research Award from the University of California, Irvine School of Social Ecology (2017) W.E.B. DuBois Award from the Western Society of Criminology (2026) Stockholm Prize in Criminology
- Scientific career
- Fields: Criminology
- Workplaces: University of California, Irvine
- Thesis: Neighborhood structure and criminal homicide: socio-economic and demographic correlates of homicide types and trends (2000)

Charis Elizabeth Kubrin is an American criminologist and professor of criminology, law, and society at the University of California, Irvine (UCI).

== Education and career ==
After receiving her Ph.D. from the University of Washington in 2000, Kubrin taught at George Washington University for 11 years; she left George Washington University for UCI in the summer of 2011. In 2016, her UCI colleague Carroll Seron and she served as editors of a special issue of the Annals of the American Academy of Political and Social Science about prison realignment in California.

== Research ==
Kubrin's research focuses on, among other topics, the relationship between race, violence, and social disorganization theory. She has also researched the perception of rap music as violent and dangerous, as well as whether a rapper's music can be used as evidence against him in a court of law. With Graham Ousey, she has also studied the relationship between immigration and crime in the United States, finding that immigration is related to lower rates of crime and violence in U.S. neighborhoods. Kubrin has stated that the Public Safety Realignment initiative was not a factor in the 2019 California stabbing rampage.
