= Griffiths Brothers Teas =

Australian tea merchant

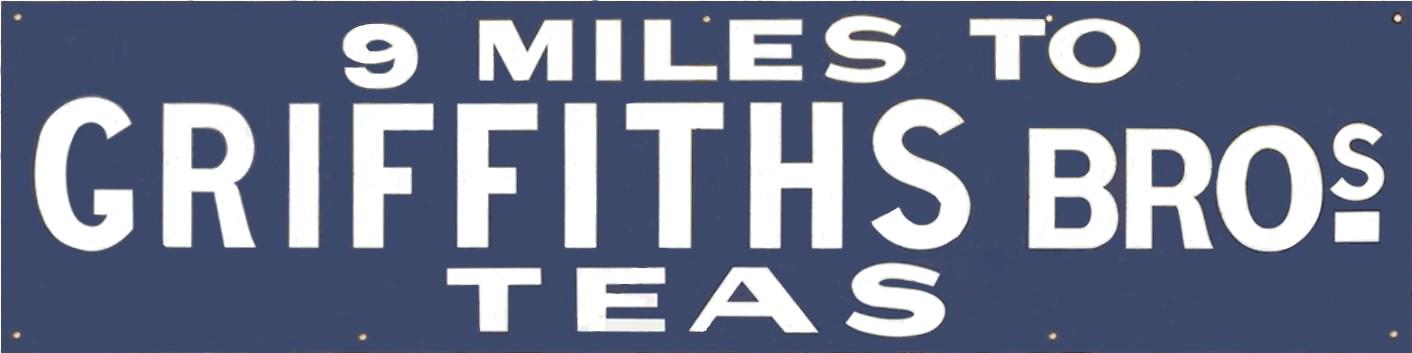
The most common form of the well-known track-side signage.

Griffiths Brothers Teas, also known as Griffiths Teas, and as a public company, Griffiths Brothers Limited, was an Australian tea, coffee and cocoa merchant. It was established in Melbourne, but subsequently opened operations in Sydney, Brisbane, and Adelaide. It was known for its distinctive advertising signs along railway lines, showing the remaining distance in "miles to Griffiths Bros. Teas".

== History ==
=== Origins ===
James Griffiths (1850–1925) had been a general storekeeper in Wolverhampton, England, before he emigrated to Melbourne in 1873, 1875 or 1879 (sources vary on the year). He initially became involved in the timber business.

In the early 1880s, Australians were, per capita, the largest consumers of tea in the world, reportedly consuming annually 6.61 pounds of tea per head. James Griffiths began importing, tea, coffee, and cocoa, in bulk, and locally packaging and distributing those products. He persuaded his brother John to emigrate and join him in the business.

=== Griffiths Brothers - partnership and companies ===
The original business was established in 1879, by James Griffiths, under his own name. He entered into a partnership with his brother, John Moore Griffiths (1855–1943), in late 1882, and from then on the business was known as Griffiths Brothers. It is probable that the word "Teas" was included in the business name due to the existence of another 'Griffiths Brothers', a large foundry and engineering works at Toowoomba.

A proprietary limited company, Griffiths Brothers Teas Pty Ltd, was registered in Victoria in 1898, and re-registered on 29 October 1913. It became a public company, Griffiths Brothers Ltd, on 2 December 1920. The public company was operating into the 1980s, but by then was no longer in its original line of business.

=== "Ferndale"and tea growing ===
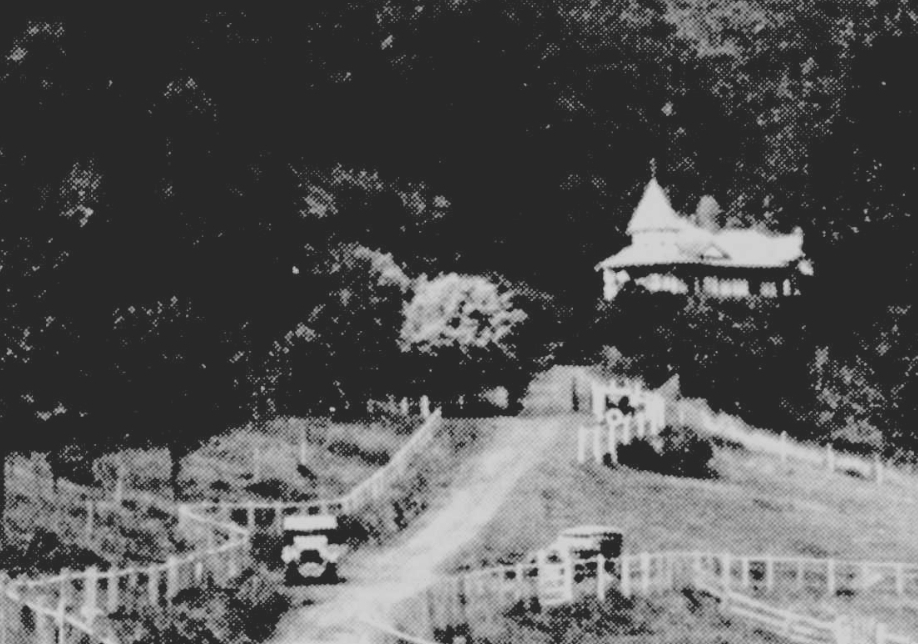
"Ferndale" in 1925.

James and Emily Griffiths' home was "Ferndale", on 184 acres (74 ha) of land in the Dandenong Ranges, around four miles from Bayswater railway station, at a locality still known as The Basin. Griffiths bought the land in 1888, and erected on it a large house, said to resemble a Swiss chalet. It first served as their country home—during the time that they lived at their mansion, "Monnington", in what is now Adeney Avenue, Kew—but "Ferndale" was their main residence from 1905. By the time it was sold, 'Ferndale' was on 320 acres (130 ha) .

Tea had been grown in Australia, as early as 1883, in Queensland. James Griffiths experimented with growing tea at "Ferndale". In 1901, he successfully grew Orange Pekoe and Lapsang souchong tea, which he judged to be better than he could import from Ceylon. However, he concluded that, "it is quite true tea can be grown in Victoria, but that it cannot be grown to pay", the main obstacle being the cost of labour.

=== Interstate growth ===
Griffith Brothers expanded to Sydney, Adelaide, and Brisbane. Although they never expanded to Perth, they did have an agent there.

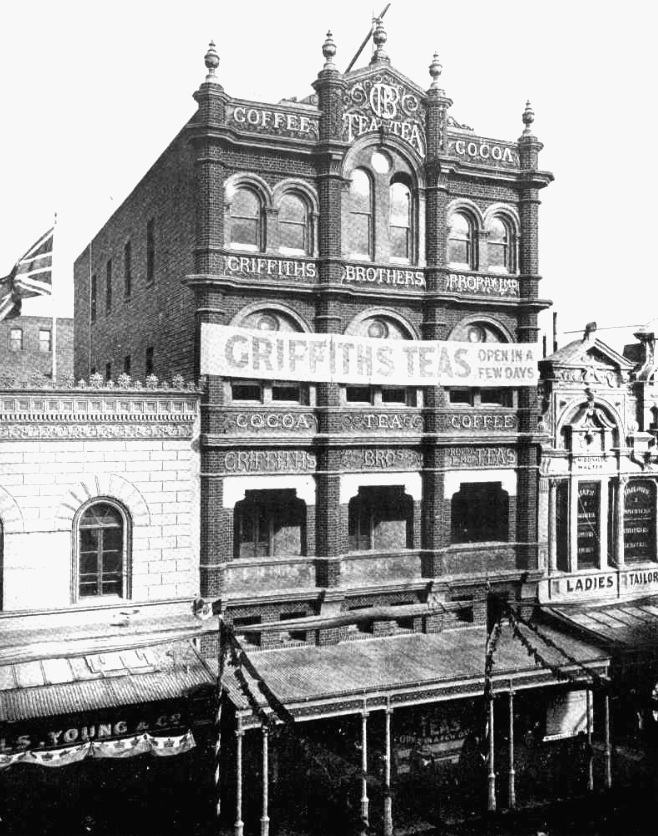
Building in Adelaide, 1901

==== Sydney ====
By late 1898, there was a "warehouse and manufactory" at 534 George Street, opposite the Sydney Town Hall, with display windows, and the company had an open invitation for the public to inspect their premises. What is still known as the Griffiths Teas building, in Wentworth Avenue, in Surry Hills, in Sydney, was designed by Henry Budden in 1912.

==== Adelaide ====
Griffith Brothers opened an Adelaide branch, at a new four-storey building at 49 Rundle Street, in 1901. The address of its Adelaide office changed from there to Hindmarsh Square, in 1921. It opened a new tea room in Gawler Place, Adelaide in 1930.

==== Brisbane ====
"Griffiths House", a six-storey building on Queen Street, Brisbane, near the intersection with Eagle Street, was built in 1923–24. The ground floor and part of the basement were tea rooms, and were the venue for many art exhibitions.

=== Family, evangelism and philanthropy ===
James Griffiths married his cousin Emily Moore (1848–1925). The couple had no biological children, but brought out from England the five children of James's deceased brother, George Friend Griffiths. They adopted the children in 1890, and raised them as their own.

John Moore Griffiths married Margaret Wightman Davidson (1867–1928), in 1891. The couple had seven children, but lost two sons; one to a cycling accident and the other on active service during World War I.

Both the Griffiths brothers were evangelists, in the Church of England (Anglican) tradition, and both were also philanthropists.

=== Products and marketing ===
Around the time that James Griffiths began as a tea merchant in Melbourne, tea was most commonly sold by grocers who weighed out portions of bulk tea that they sold to their customers. Fear of adulteration—either due to known attempts to mask cheap tea or intentionally spread rumours to encourage use of British-controlled Indian and Ceylon teas over Chinese teas— led to legislation, and to a new retail offering: branded, factory-packaged tea.

Although packaged tea was the main product Griffith Brothers also sold packaged coffee, chickory, coffee and chicory blend, cocoa, malted cocoa, and baking powder.

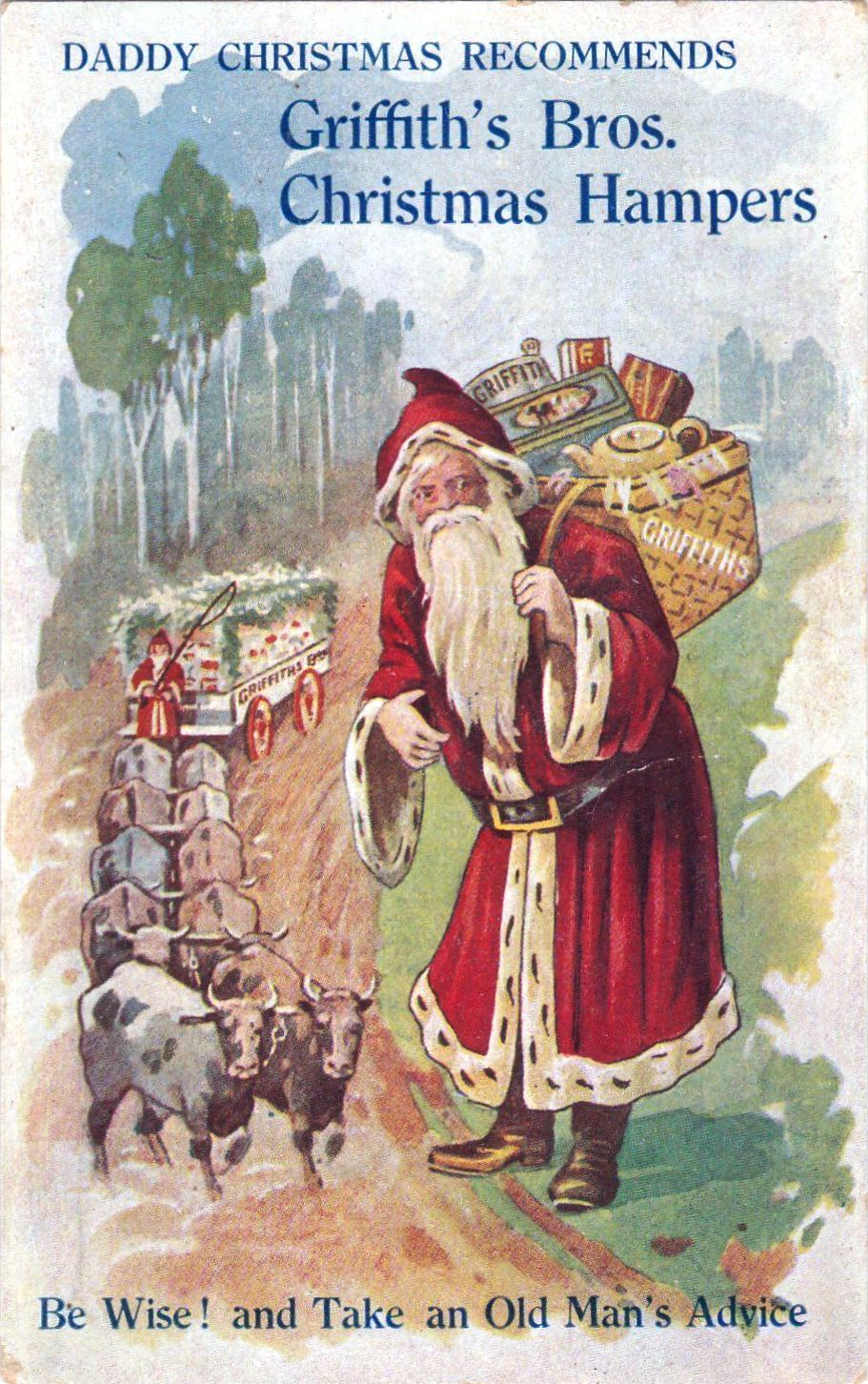
Advertising postcard, 1908

They also sold hampers of their products, which could be given as gifts, and specialty items such as tins of sugared peanuts and confectionery, "eating chocolate", teapots, strainers, and other items that could be a part of those hampers.

Griffiths Brothers sold tea in packages, but also in more substantial tinplate metal canisters, which were printed and, in some cases, also embossed. Some of their tea canisters came already identified with other cooking ingredients—currants, oatmeal, sago, tapioca, barley, starch, spices—allowing them to be re-purposed as kitchen canisters, once emptied of tea. That approach encouraged customers to keep buying Griffiths Brothers tea in canisters, to obtain enough for a complete set.

Griffiths Brothers tea branding had an association with railways. An advertising logo of the company was a railway semaphore signal showing "all clear". Their "Red Signal" brand was for a blended Ceylon tea, whereas "Green Signal" was for a China Pekoe tea. The same "Signal" brand was used for their baking powder. They also used the word "Sunbeam" as a brand name for tea, coffee, cocoa, chocolate, and baking powder.

The most famous of Griffiths Brothers marketing initiatives were the many blue and white, vitreous enamelled sheet steel signs erected along railway lines, showing the remaining distance in "miles to Griffiths Bros. Teas". They were installed along suburban, country, and interstate railways in eastern Australia, ranging from a two-mile sign (such as at Redfern) to ones showing hundreds of miles to the destination. The signs were already a familiar part of railway travel by 1913. In New South Wales, the Department of Railways had a contract to renew the signs every five years.

Sometimes, instead of erecting a sign, the wall of a building or other structure, adjacent to a railway line, was painted with the same advertising message, using the familiar blue and white colour scheme. There is a surviving example of another type of enamelled sheet steel sign, of a different shape to the more famous railway signs. It has a blue background with a large white letter 'T', upon which is superimposed the words "Griffiths Teas" in red text and, below that, a distance in miles. There are photographs dating from the 1970s, showing that type of sign installed on buildings on Victorian Railways station platforms. After motorised road traffic became more common, there were also roadside signs on major highways conveying the same message.

=== First World War ===
During the First World War, the company made hampers to be sent to soldiers on active duty. The advertising of Griffiths Brothers was so well known that it became a ready-made source of humour for Australian soldiers on duty far from home, in both the First and Second World Wars.

Improvised signage adorned many places Australian soldiers passed through during the First World War. Examples were painted on a fence rail in the Valley of the Somme, "12,000 miles to Griffiths Brothers for the best teas, coffee and cocoa." and at the railway station at Ribemont, France ("13,000 miles, to Griffiths Brothers' Tea.").

=== Deaths of James and Emily Griffiths. ===
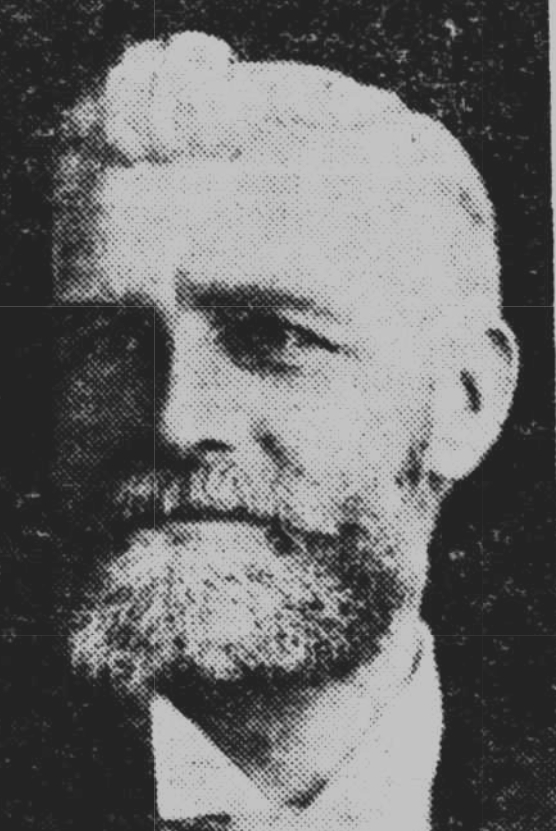
James Griffiths in later life.

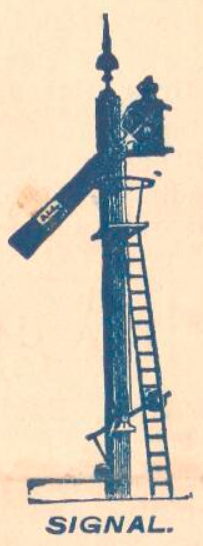
Signal logo.

Given that an advertising logo of the company was a railway semaphore signal showing "all clear", the death of James Griffiths in a railway level crossing accident, on 6 April 1925, was what an obituary called "a melancholy coincidence". A wagonette, driven by Griffiths, was on the way to Bayswater railway station to meet Arthur Henry Harris, the manager of "Ferndale", when it was struck by a train at a level crossing. After the accident, Griffiths's watch was found to be running ten minutes behind, leading to speculation that was the reason he had not expected a train to be nearby.

Janet Emily Harris (Harris's daughter) was killed instantly, James Griffiths and Elizabeth Morton died at the scene of the accident, and Emily, James Griffiths wife died of her injuries four days later. The sole survivor was Joe Shelley, a doctor and son of the man who had been the tea taster for the company, who remained a close friend of the Griffiths brothers. Shelley was injured. The two horses were unhurt.

James Griffiths funeral took place on 8 April 1925. He was buried at Boroondara Cemetery. Because her husband had predeceased her, Emily Griffiths had to make a new will hurriedly, on 9 April 1925, and died on the following day.

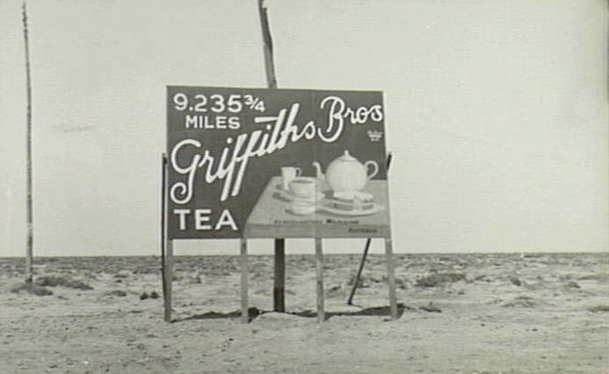
Griffiths Tea sign in the Western Desert, North Africa, April 1941. It imitates one of the company's signs.

=== Second World War ===
There are surviving photographs of signs in Libya, the work of Sapper Leslie John "Doc" Dawes, 2/3rd Field Company, Royal Australian Engineers, made in 1941 using captured Italian paints. Before the Second World War, Dawes had been a signwriter. At least two of the signs that he painted imitated Griffiths Brothers Teas advertisements.

In 1942, as fears of invasion grew, it was decided, that signs showing distances would be removed on roads in New South Wales, so as to deny an invader information. That included Griffiths Brothers Teas road-side signs.

The war affected the company itself; wartime price controls, which fixed the price of tea by regulation, inevitably affected the company's profitability.

=== Later years of the company ===
The remaining Griffiths brother, John Moore Griffiths, retired from the company in 1936, and died in 1943.

Griffiths Brothers, as late as the early 1940s, only sold their products directly to the public. They had their own shops and tea rooms, and still used what was, by then, an old-fashioned practice of company travelling salesmen dealing directly with the public. The business was unable to pay a dividend in 1940. In March 1942, the company ceased to sell directly to the public, except for a small mail order operation, and began supplying tea, coffee and other products to grocers and storekeepers, on a wholesale basis.

The company began to diversify away from the tea and coffee business. In 1938, Griffiths Brothers set up a hire purchase and general financing subsidiary company, Griffiths Bros. Credits Pty. Ltd. It had already operated a furniture showroom in Melbourne, "for many years", by 1946. In 1949, the company was able to pay a dividend on its ordinary shares, the first for ten years, and to make a payment of arrears interest to preference shareholders. In the same year, it sold its buildings in Flinders Street, Melbourne and Gawler Place, Adelaide, to reduce debt.

By the early 1950s, the company had diversified extensively into other areas, so much so that, in 1952, tea merchandising contributed only a small part of the company's profits. General merchandising, including home appliance retailing, as well as a finance subsidiary, were its main businesses by 1954.

Griffiths Tea was on sale in the second half of the 1980s, still using the "Red Signal" and "Green Signal" branding of Griffiths Brothers' heyday. However, in the 1960s the tea merchandising side of Griffiths Brothers had been taken over by the Robur Tea Company Limited—another Melbourne-based tea company— so only the Griffiths Tea brand survived, without mention of any brothers in the brand name.

As of 2025, there is a Melbourne coffee roaster using the brand name "Griffiths Bros" and claiming descent from the original 1879 venture. It also offers some specialty teas.

In 1970, Griffiths Brothers Limited put its Sydney properties up for sale, with plans to reinvest the proceeds of the sales. 38% of the company's shares were bought, in 1976, by Associated Rural Industries, a company that was delisted in December 1976. Griffiths Brothers was still active in the 1980s. The company registered in 1913, Griffiths Brothers Pty Ltd. (ACN 004 068 857), was deregistered in 2003, and it was noted that one of its former names was 'Griffiths Brothers Limited'.

== Remnants and legacy ==
Few, if any, of the iconic blue and white signs, remain in place along railway lines, though they were still quite common into the 1960s. Examples exist in the collections of the Powerhouse Museum, the Puffing Billy Railway, and Yarra Ranges Regional Museum. Many others survive in private hands, after being removed from existing and former railway lines. These signs remain sought-after collectable items, as do Griffiths Brothers metal canisters.

The company's building in Sydney survives, re-purposed by 2018 after many years of being essentially derelict, but the six-storey, "Griffiths House" in Queens St, Brisbane was demolished in 1975. The former Griffith's Brothers Tea warehouse in Flinders Street, Melbourne was constructed in 1899, designed by the architects Ward and Carleton. It was later a billiard hall operated by a niece of Walter Lindrum, and named after him, and subsequently the Lindrum Hotel, one of the first of Melbourne's boutique hotels. As of 2025, it was to be incorporated into the redevelopment of its site as an office building. The new development preserves the original building's facade.

James and Emily Griffiths' home, "Ferndale", became a successful guest house. After it closed, the building fell into disrepair, but survived until 1962, when it was destroyed by a bushfire. There is now a short walking track, named the Ferndale Track, which passes by the site of the former house. The land had been subdivided into 100 lots, but the January 1962 bushfire proved that it was unwise to build anything there, and it was resumed as parkland. Griffiths Falls on Griffiths Creek are a reminder of the Griffiths and their long-gone house.

Tea is still grown in Australia, mainly by Nerada Tea and Madura Tea Estates, but most tea consumed in Australia continues to be imported. Australia is the 20th largest importer of tea in the world. However, tea has long since been supplanted by coffee in Australia, as the country's most popular hot beverage.

The last product related to Griffiths Brothers Teas was "Green Signal Tea", described as "a blended China Pekoe, with a distinctive smoky flavour". The packaged loose leaf tea was last sold under the Billy Tea - Robur brand. The Robur Tea Company had been bought by Tetley, which in turn was bought by the Indian conglomerate Tata. Tata discontinued the product in early 2025, and its devotees sought out dwindling stocks of "Green Signal Tea" in IGA and FoodWorks stores.

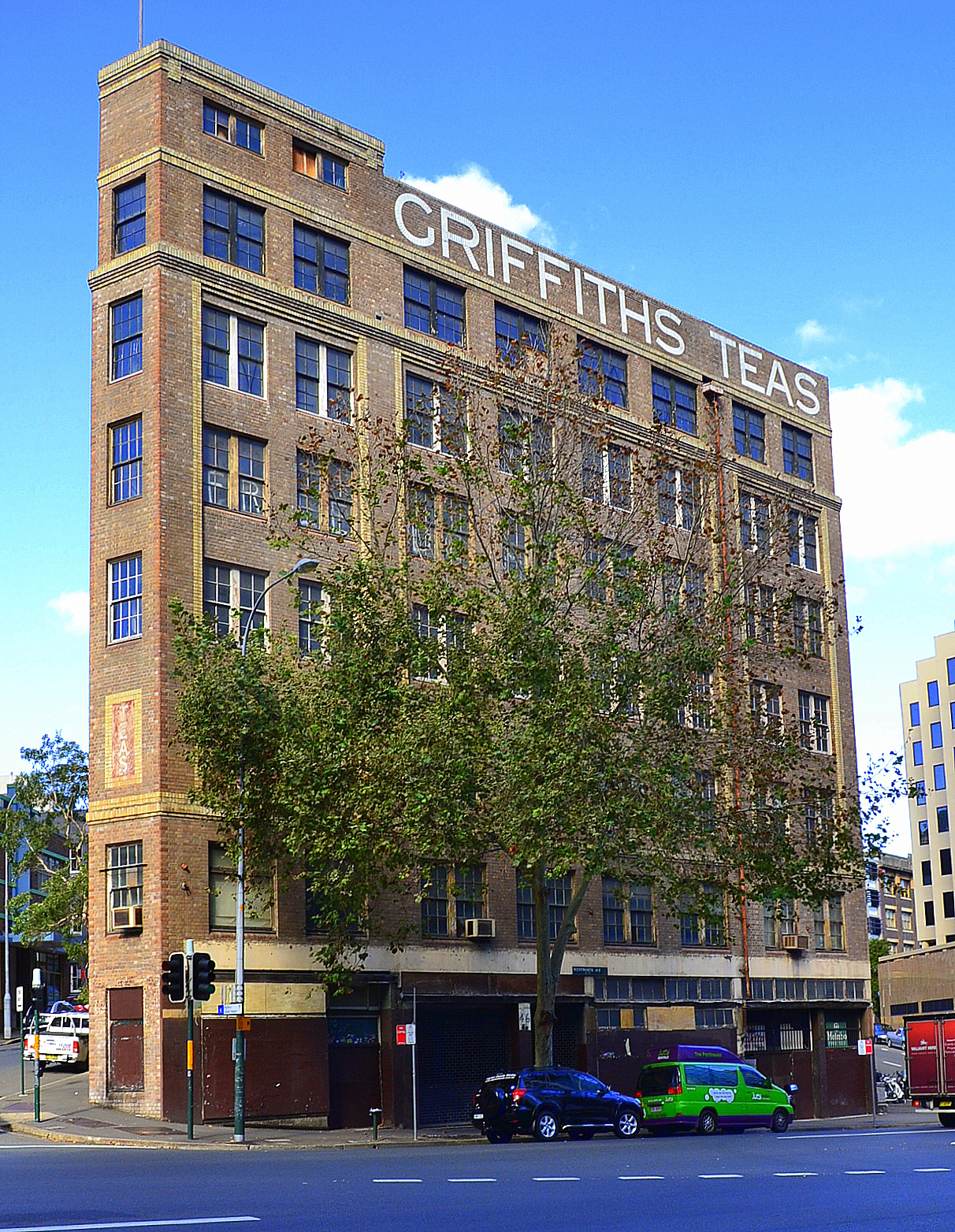
Griffiths Teas building in Sydney, viewed from Wentworth Ave, with Commonwealth St on left. The facades facing these streets form an acute angle, May 2014

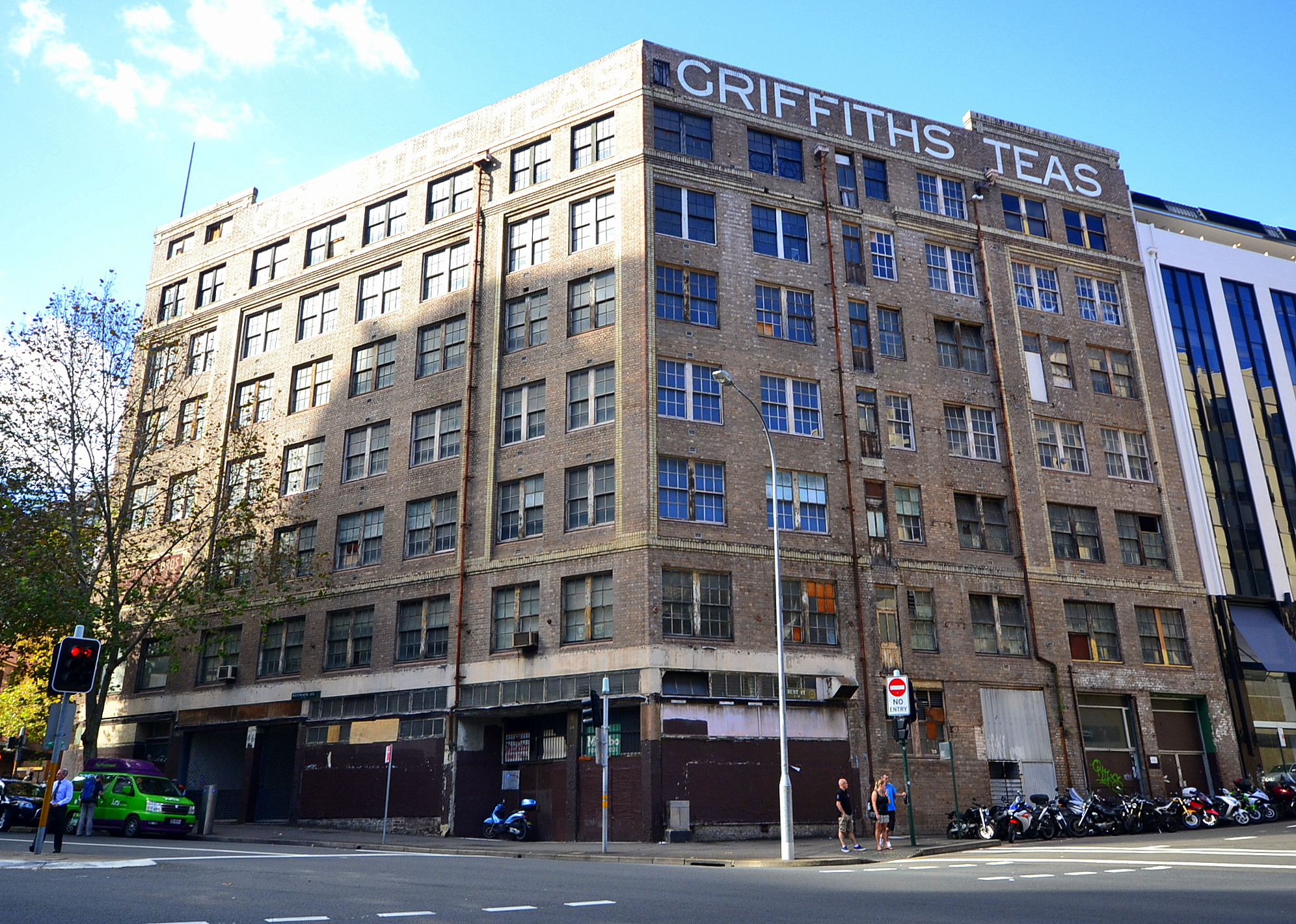
Griffiths Teas building in Sydney, view from the intersection of Wentworth Ave (left) and Hunt St (right). The facades facing these streets form an obtuse angle, May 2014

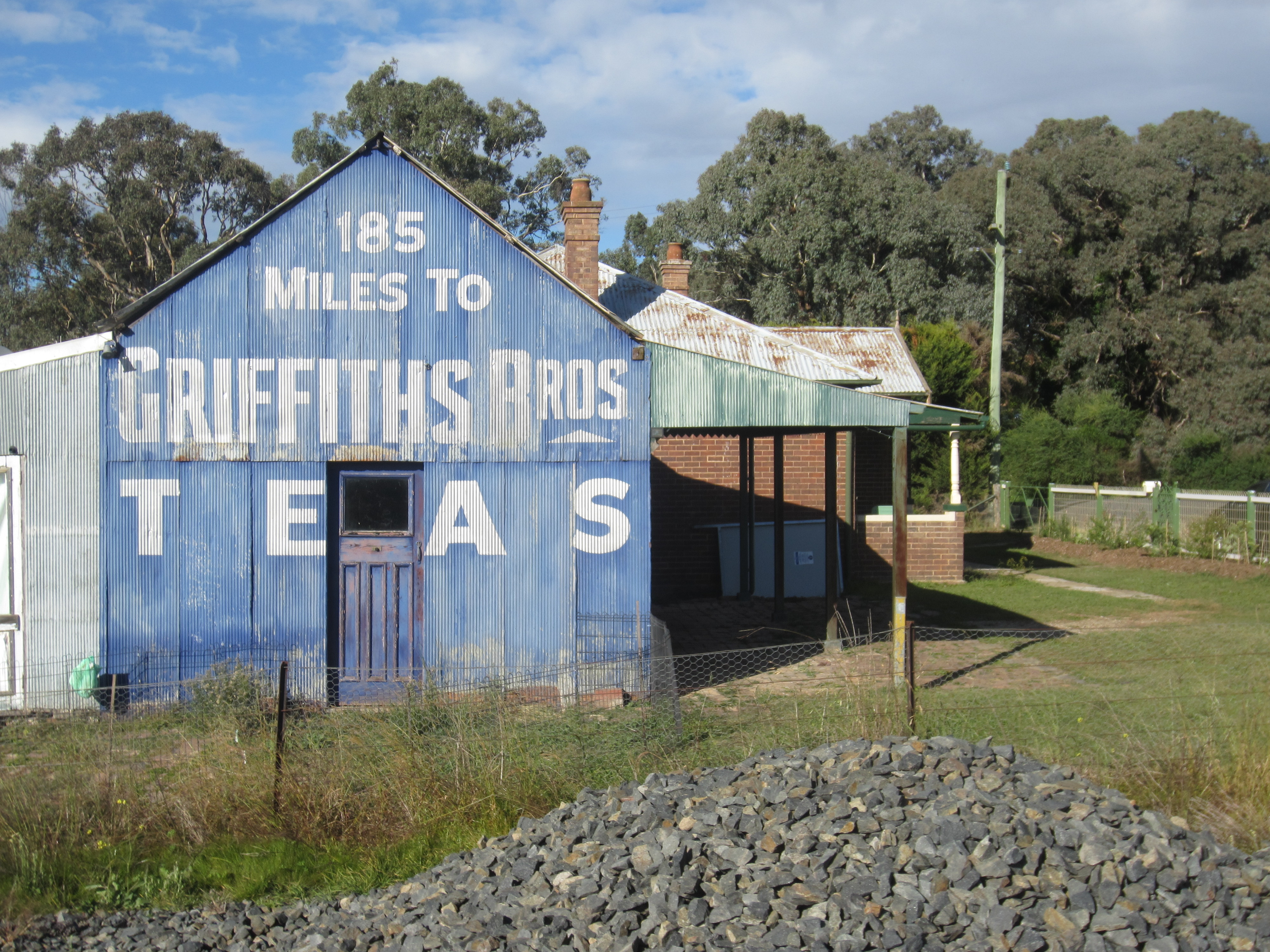
Advertising sign on wall of the former post office and store facing the Main Southern railway line at Jerrawa, April 2021.

== See also ==
- Tea in Australia
- List of oldest companies in Australia
- List of tea companies
