= Model factory and dwelling, The Rocks =

Model Factory and Dwelling, The Rocks
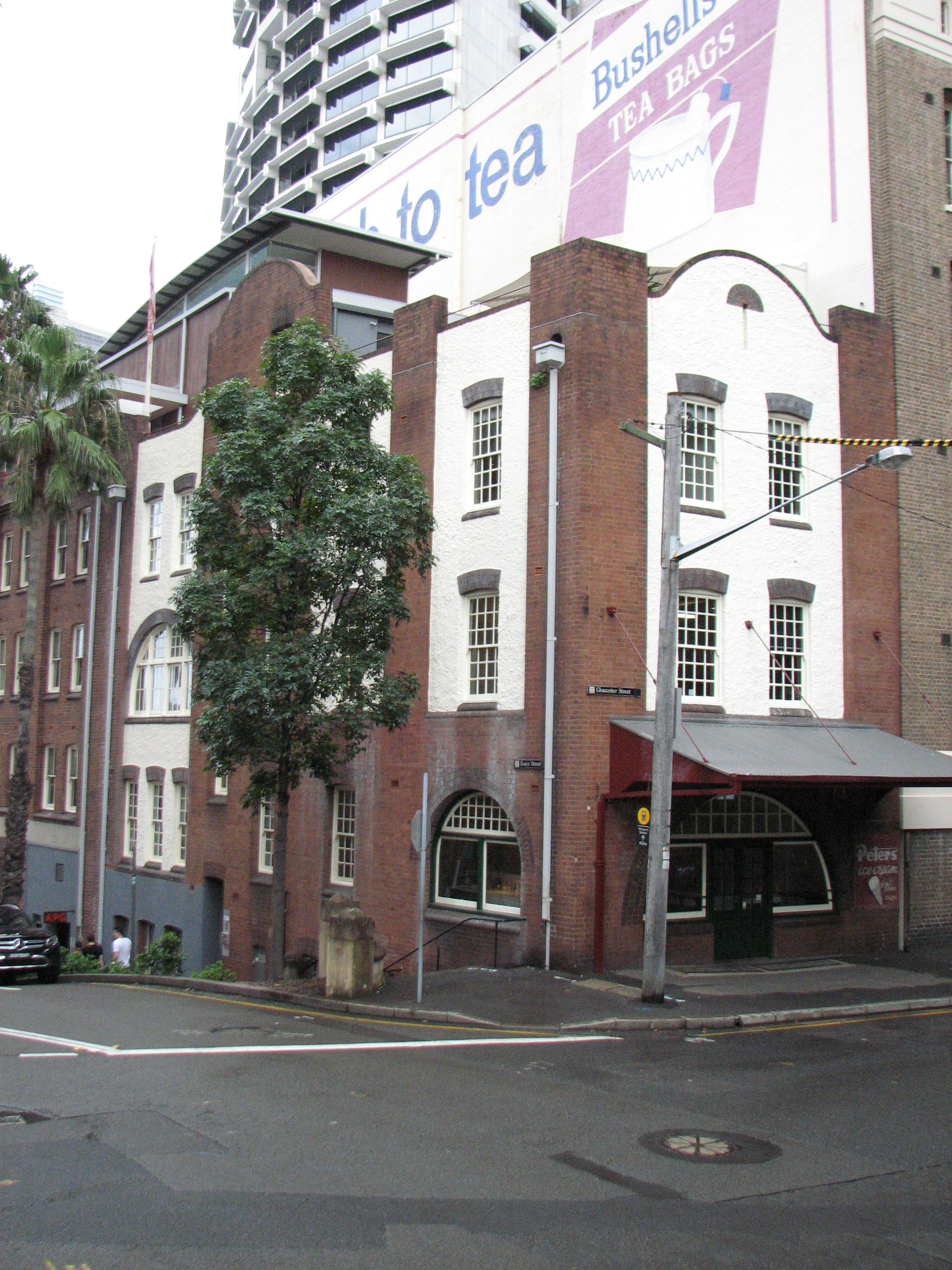

- Location within Sydney Location within Australia
- 33.8621°S 151.2066°E
- Location: 120 Gloucester Street, The Rocks, City of Sydney, New South Wales, Australia

History
- Built: 1912–1913

Site notes
- Architect: George McRae
- Architectural style: Federation Arts and Crafts
- Owner: Property NSW

New South Wales Heritage Register
- Official name: Model Factory and Dwelling; Chung Lun Building;
- Type: State heritage (built)
- Designated: 10 May 2002
- Reference no.: 1552
- Type: Government House
- Category: Commercial

The Model Factory and Dwelling is a heritage-listed former factory, store and dwelling and now offices located at 120 Gloucester Street in the inner city Sydney suburb of The Rocks in the City of Sydney local government area of New South Wales, Australia. It was designed by George McRae and built from 1912 to 1913. It is also known as Chung Lun Building. The property is owned by Property NSW, an agency of the Government of New South Wales. It was added to the New South Wales State Heritage Register on 10 May 2002.

== History ==
=== Frog Hollow ===
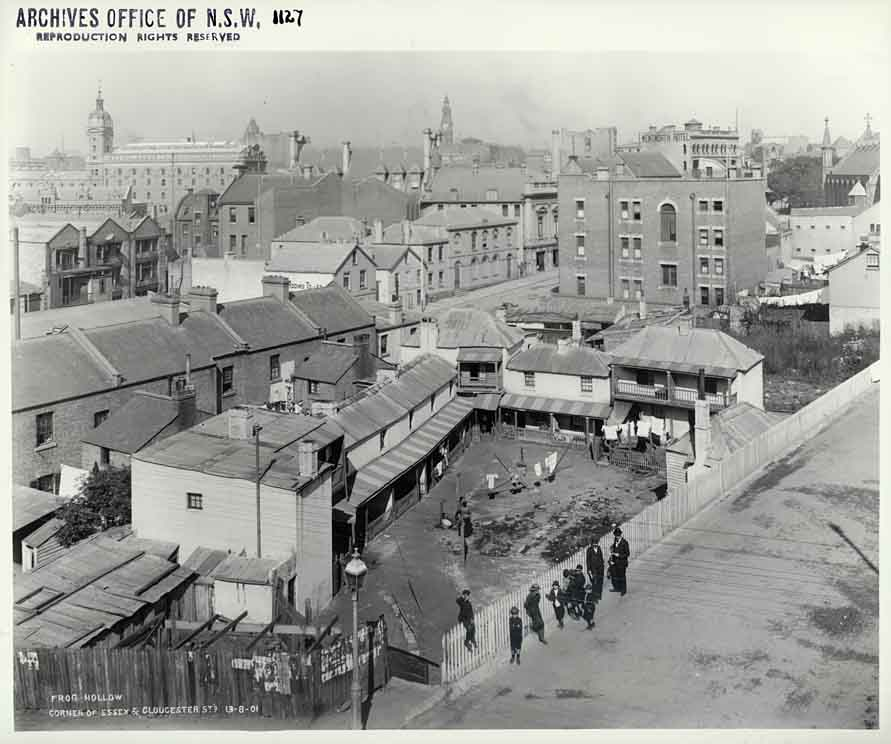
Frog Hollow, pictured in 1901, prior to resumption and demolition

There is a considerable height difference between Harrington and Gloucester Streets and for the entire nineteenth century there were no buildings with a Gloucester Street frontage at the northern end of the block; rather single- and two-storey buildings were located in the hollow below, which became known as Frog Hollow. The housing in Frog Hollow was of a much lower standard than the terrace that developed fronting Harrington Street. These buildings had no street access other than via stairs and passageways. Frog Hollow contained 12 dwellings of which ten were identical in plan, containing a single room on the ground floor, with a fireplace, and a single room above. The front door opened directly into the ground floor room and the staircase was located along the back wall. Of the remaining three dwellings, one was of the same type, but extended considerably and a second was a single-storey block containing three rooms.

The residences in Frog Hollow and lining Harrington Street were all tenanted. It was a characteristic of The Rocks that the lower-standard accommodation was in the back lanes, with a higher quality of house fronting the streets. By the mid-1880s a set of stairs had been built from the corner of Essex Street leading down into Frog Hollow. These passages and steps provided the only access to the houses in Frog Hollow.

By 1900 the buildings in Frog Hollow were the property of Peter Francis Hart (1840–1917). Hart, a builder and contractor, had served as the Alderman for the Gipps Ward of the Council of the City of Sydney from 1883 until 1899. Despite his ownership of properties later condemned, Hart appears to have been interested in urban improvements, serving on various Council committees including the Refuse Committee, the Specifications and Tenders Committee, the Heights of Buildings Committee and the Electric Lighting Committee. Hart had other properties in the vicinity, and Harts Buildings (now Hart's pub) at 10-14 Essex Street built in the 1890s still bear his name.

=== Resumption, demolition and redevelopment ===
Following the outbreak of bubonic plague in December 1900, an extensive cleansing of the perceived slum areas was undertaken and the entire area from Millers Point, where the outbreak occurred, as far south as Charlotte Place (Grosvenor Street) was resumed by the state, under the Public Works Act.

It is no wonder that the group of dwellings in Frog Hollow was condemned, as the record plan shows that for the 12 dwellings there were only three privies. One dwelling had a designated kitchen, although one of the ground floor rooms of the house in the middle of the group is also likely to have served as a kitchen. The remainder of the houses had one room on the ground floor which was used as combined kitchen and living room. There were no bathrooms. Frog Hollow was demolished between November 1901 and April 1905.

The irregular allotments at the intersection of Gloucester and Essex Streets were regularised and 20 new lots created, each with a street frontage. A survey was undertaken in April 1905 and the first "auction sale of the Observatory Hill lands" occurred on 4 December 1905.

Drawings for a building on the corner site were prepared by the Government Architect's Branch under the jurisdiction of George McRae, dated 28 February 1909 and designated as a "Factory and Dwelling". The factory was designed with the health of the workers in mind, providing natural light, fireproof construction and a staff dining room. No. 120 Gloucester Street is the only surviving example of a model factory within the resumed areas.

The structure contained storage space in the basement level, warehousing on the ground floor, workrooms on the first floor, and a three-bedroom flat on the second floor. A letter to the town clerk written in 1911 refers to the "new factory at 120 Gloucester Street". Council's rate book for the Gipps Ward for the years 1911–1913 notes that a store and factory at 120 Gloucester St was rated to Chung Lun and owned by the Government of NSW (Rocks Resumptions).

Chung Lun previously held premises at 28–30 Essex Street, operating as "soft-goods warehousemen". Chung Lun continued his links with 120 Gloucester Street until 1926. The building was then rated to Ella Beatrice Steward who operated the refreshment rooms until the mid-1940s. In a document dated 30 March 2011, the NSW Office of Environment and Heritage incorrectly named the building at 120 Gloucester Street "the Housing Board Building". This seems to result from its confusion with another building in The Rocks built to house the Resumed Properties section of the Department of Public Works which was located at No. 16-18 Grosvenor Street, namely the NSW Housing Board Building in Grosvenor Street.

=== Developments since the 1990s ===
The building continued to function as a shop and residence until c. 1990 when it was used as a site office for the construction of the "Quay West" apartment building on the opposite side of Essex Street. In 1997 builder, R. E. Charles Constructions Pty Ltd was engaged to undertake repair and maintenance works at 120 Gloucester St which amounted to $26,359. Work continued into 1998 on the roof of the building. In December 2003 the NSW Heritage Council approved a development application for the upgrading of the building and its combination with the adjoining building at 117–119 Harrington Street. The proposal was prepared by the architect, John Graham & Associates. These plans were used as a basis to attract expressions of interest for the conservation and adaptive re-use of the building to be funded by the future developer/occupant of the building in return for a long lease to the building. In June 2004 title to the building was transferred from the Sydney Cove Redevelopment Authority to the Sydney Harbour Foreshore Authority. In 2005 a revised development application was lodged by HEG Holdings Pty Ltd which was prepared by architects, Noosphere Ideas Pty Ltd. whilst combining the buildings at 120 Gloucester and 117–119 Harrington Streets, the revised proposal deleted the already approved new top floor to 117–119 Harrington Street and substituted a two-storey, lightweight penthouse of unambiguously modern design. The 1950 lift shaft and stairs were retained in their original location within 117–119 Harrington Street. The 2006 work uncovered a severely deteriorated interior to 120 Gloucester Street.

Application was sought and approval given to vary the conditions of consent so that the interior timbers could be removed and replaced with new timbers. This work necessitated the gutting of the building back to its masonry walls. All the original internal fabric was lost including timber floor structure and flooring, timber staircase, corrugated metal ceilings, internal non-masonry walls, etc. In addition the roof top laundry and chimneys were also lost along with the roof structure. The parapet along the east side of the building adjoining 117–119 Harrington Street was demolished so that the terrace area of the penthouse at 117-119 Harrington Street could be extended over part of the roof area of 120 Gloucester Street. This work was carried out in 2006.

In 2005 a 99-year lease was signed with HEG Holdings Pty Ltd who developed the building project and in 2006 the lease was transferred to the current lessee, Downey Day Walden. 117–119 Harrington Street is now known as Dawnay Day House and is the Australian headquarters of the Dawnay Day Group. In addition to containing the offices of Dawnay Day Walden, the combined building of 117–119 Harrington Street and 120 Gloucester Street contains the offices of various tenants which are accessed from the four entrances to the combined buildings. The four entrances are located at 117–119 Harrington Street, 7 Essex Street, 5 Essex Street and 120 Gloucester Street.

Archaeology notes: Site of Frog Hollow (reputation for being a slum), demolished c. 1901. Housing board erected the current shop/ dwelling/ warehouse in 1909.

== Description ==
Located on the corner of Essex and Gloucester Streets, the site falls from west to east. The building is adjoined at the east by Accountants House. Situated to the immediate south is the Bushells Building. The Model Factory building is a fine example of the Federation Arts and Crafts style, which is characterised by the integration of face-brick and roughcast detailing to external walls and the decorative design of the parapet walls. It contains a basement, ground floor, two upper floors, and a flat trafficable roof. Construction comprises a steel frame with timber frame floors, and load-bearing masonry walls.

Style: Federation Arts and Crafts;
Storeys: 3;
Facade: red-brown face brick laid in English bond;
Internal walls: load-bearing masonry walls;
Roof cladding: membrane with a protective layer of pebbles;
Floor frame: timber.

=== Condition ===
Archaeology Assessment Condition as of 27 April 2001: Mostly disturbed. Assessment Basis: Basements terraced into hill slope.

=== Modifications and dates ===
- 1997 – Repair and maintenance works. Work continued into 1998 on the roof of the building.
- 2003 – Upgrading of the building and its combination with the adjoining building at 117-119 Harrington Street.
- 2005 – A revised development application combining the buildings at 120 Gloucester and 117-119 Harrington Streets, the revised proposal deleted the already approved new top floor to 117-119 Harrington Street and substituted a two-storey, lightweight penthouse of unambiguously modern design. The 1950 lift shaft and stairs were retained in their original location within 117-119 Harrington Street. The 2006 work uncovered a severely deteriorated interior to 120 Gloucester Street.
- 2006 – All the original internal fabric was lost including timber floor structure and flooring, timber staircase, corrugated metal ceilings, internal non-masonry walls, etc. In addition the roof top laundry and chimneys were also lost along with the roof structure. The parapet along the east side of the building adjoining 117-119 Harrington Street was demolished so that the terrace area of the penthouse at 117-119 Harrington St could be extended over part of the roof area of 120 Gloucester Street.

=== Further information ===
The façades are substantially intact with regard to expressing the original 1911 form of the building including the external brickwork, roughcast render, timber window and door frames, the suspended awning over the Gloucester Street shopfront and the dramatically curved parapet around the flat roof. The addition of the penthouse to the roof of 117–119 Harrington Street alters the view and appreciation of the building looking east down Essex Street. The tiling around the Essex Street entry to the lowest floor and the subsequent removal of the tiles (leaving a cement-rendered area) impacts on the integrity of the Essex Street façade. The interior structure of mild-steel stanchion and mild-steel main beam remains, but all the timber joists and flooring have been removed and replaced. Interior wall and floor tiling and all the sanitary fixtures have been removed.

== Heritage listing ==
The Model Factory and Workers Dwelling at 120 Gloucester Street, The Rocks and site is of State heritage significance for its historical, aesthetic and scientific cultural values. The site and building are also of State heritage significance for their contribution to The Rocks area which is of State Heritage significance in its own right. The building and site demonstrate the attempt by the State Government to regularise, and plan in an orderly manner, the layout of streets and buildings in The Rocks following the early twentieth-century resumption, re-subdivision and building renewal of The Rocks undertaken under the guidance of the NSW Government Architect Walter Liberty Vernon. It is one of the buildings constructed during the first stage of the urban renewal, constructed prior to World War I. Two of the Government Architects Branch's most prominent architects, George McRae and Edward Drew, were involved with this design.

The building demonstrates a novel, rare design of a model factory and dwelling designed by the State Government to improve the living standards and health of the working population. The model factory and the adjacent park predates the surviving garden factories in Australia which were modelled, in turn, on Port Sunlight and Bourneville in England and is unusual in that it was constructed amidst an existing urban area. This design shows the NSW Government Architect's long-standing interest in workers' housing and the improvement of the urban environment. The scale, form, use of materials and detailing of the building makes a positive contribution to the intact 19th and early 20th century streetscapes of the Gloucester, Harrington, and Essex Street precinct.

120 Gloucester Street, The Rocks has a high level of aesthetic significance as an early example of a Federation Free Style factory. Designed by the NSW Government Architect's Branch, who pioneered the Free Style in NSW, and erected in 1910–1911 the building reflects architectural trends in London. The purity of detailing is strongly exemplified by the integration of face brick and roughcast, and the strongly curved parapet walls, employing a palette of materials widely used in model workers' housing in England and in Australia.

The model factory and dwelling is a complete contrast to the slum dwellings in Frog Hollow that it replaced and was constructed of "fire proof" materials with good ventilation and light levels, evidence of which survives. Within the output of the Government Architect's Branch this is a rare building type and is the only known factory and dwelling building designed to be leased. The recorded drawings and photographs of the substandard buildings in Frog Hollow and their demolition provide an insight into the slum dwellings owned by city aldermen that were concealed in the back lanes.

The building was listed on the New South Wales State Heritage Register on 10 May 2002 having satisfied the following criteria.

The place is important in demonstrating the course, or pattern, of cultural or natural history in New South Wales.

The building and site are of State heritage significance for their historical and scientific cultural values and are also of State heritage significance for their contribution to The Rocks area which is of State Heritage significance in its own right. The building and site demonstrate the attempt by the State Government to regularise, and plan in an orderly manner, the layout of streets and buildings in The Rocks following the early twentieth century resumption, re-subdivision and building renewal of The Rocks. The building is a rare example in the New South Wales context of a Free Style factory building that embodies the utopian principles of the Arts and Crafts Movement.

The building is a rare example of a model factory and dwelling constructed by the State Government and the only known example intended to be leased.

The place has a strong or special association with a person, or group of persons, of importance of cultural or natural history of New South Wales's history.

The building is associated with the senior designers of the Government Architect's Branch of the NSW Department of Public Works: Edward Drew and George McRae.

The place is important in demonstrating aesthetic characteristics and/or a high degree of creative or technical achievement in New South Wales.

The building has aesthetic significance as a rare example in the New South Wales context of a Free Style factory, a style pioneered in NSW by the NSW Government Architect. The selection of Free Style for the urban renewal of The Rocks and Millers Point was modelled on the urban renewal in London being undertaken by the London County Council which the Government Architect had observed in 1897. The scale, form, use of materials and detailing of the building makes a positive contribution to the intact 19th and early 20th century streetscapes of the Gloucester, Harrington, and Essex Street precinct. The use of the combination of roughcast and face brick was prevalent in the design of workers' housing in England and in Australia. The building has technical significance in that the interior of the building was detailed to provide a "fireproof" form of construction with the steel column and beam in the front section of the building and the use of corrugated and pressed metal ceilings and stair soffits throughout the building. The building has technical significance in that the lower levels of the building were provided with through ventilation by means of shafts incorporated into the chimney breast which drew hot and stale air up to the roof level.

The place has a strong or special association with a particular community or cultural group in New South Wales for social, cultural or spiritual reasons.

The building and site demonstrate the attempt by the State Government to regularise, and plan, in an orderly manner, the layout of streets and buildings in The Rocks following the early twentieth-century resumption, resubdivision and building renewal of The Rocks. It was a consciously designed environment, with well-designed factories and dwellings replacing the sub standard dwellings hidden in the back lanes.

The place possesses uncommon, rare or endangered aspects of the cultural or natural history of New South Wales.

The building is a rare example in the New South Wales context of the use of Free Style for a factory building and is of a very high quality of design. The building is a rare example in the New South Wales context of a model factory and dwelling constructed by the NSW State Government. It is an early example of a "garden factory", where landscaped parks or grounds were provided for the workers and it predates the series of garden factories modelled on the English examples of Port Sunlight and Bourneville that includes Raleigh Park at Kensington (Sydney), the Bryant and May factory at Richmond (Victoria) and on the Derwent River in Tasmania (Lutana and Claremont).

== See also ==
- Australian non-residential architectural styles
- NSW Housing Board Building, Grosvenor Street, The Rocks
