= Old Bushells Factory =

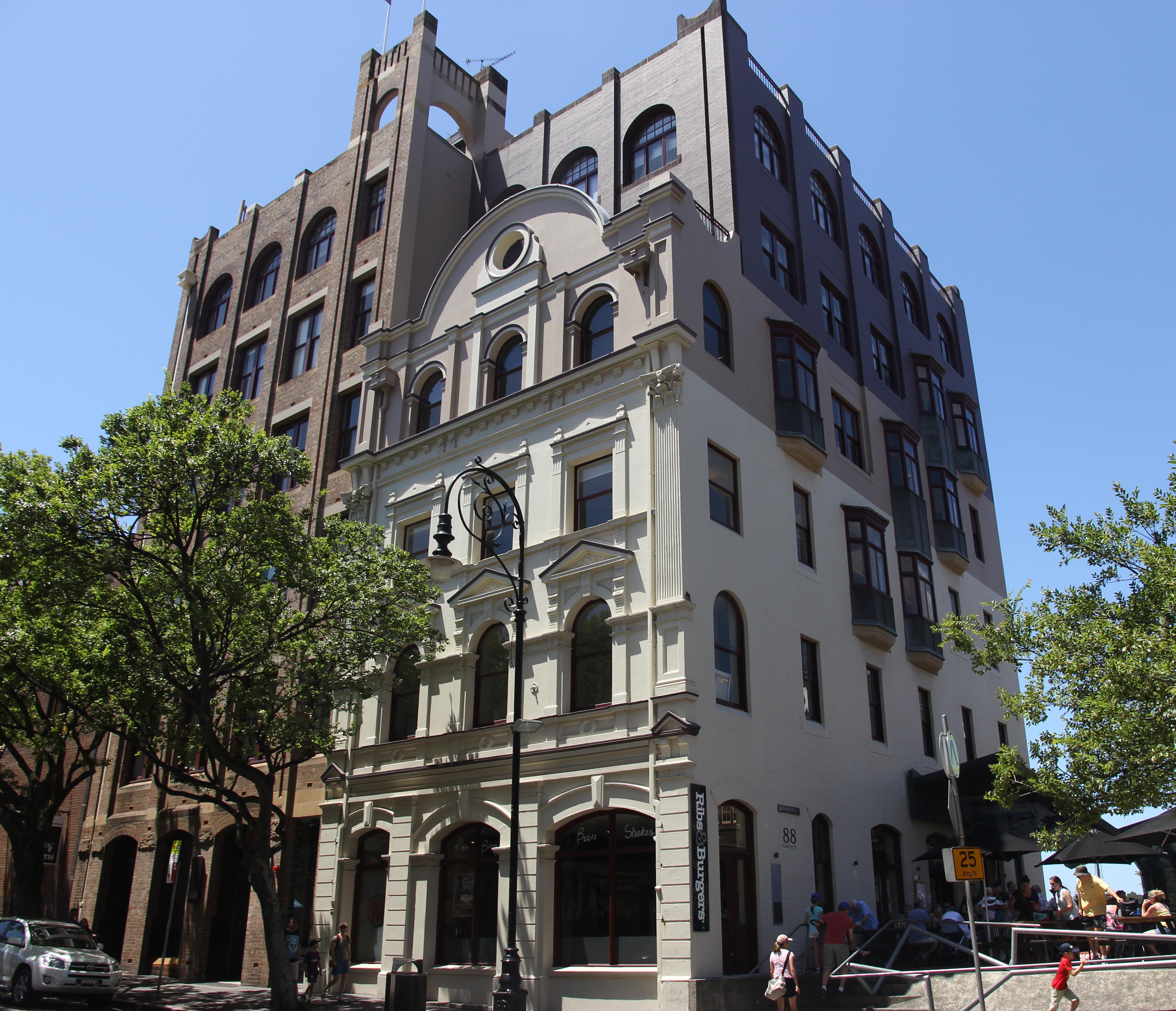
- Old Bushells Factory, pictured in 2019

- Location within Sydney Location within Australia
- 33.8578°S 151.2091°E
- Location: 86–88 George Street, The Rocks, City of Sydney, New South Wales, Australia

History
- Built: 1886–1912

Site notes
- Architect: No 86: Walter Liberty Vernon
- Architectural styles: No. 86: Federation Warehouse; No. 88: Victorian Free Classical
- Owner: Property NSW

New South Wales Heritage Register
- Official name: Old Bushells Factory and Warehouse and Bushells Place; Bushells Warehouse; Bushells Offices/Health Commission Building (Bushell's)
- Type: State heritage (built)
- Designated: 10 May 2002
- Reference no.: 1535
- Type: Other - Manufacturing & Processing
- Category: Manufacturing and Processing

The Old Bushells Factory is a heritage-listed former Bushells Tea factory and warehouse, now used as shops, offices and an art gallery, located at 86–88 George Street in the inner city Sydney suburb of The Rocks in the City of Sydney local government area of New South Wales, Australia. No. 86 was designed by Walter Liberty Vernon; and both buildings were built from 1886 to 1912. It is also known as the Old Bushells Factory and Warehouse; Bushells Place; Bushells Warehouse and Bushells Offices; and Health Commission Building (Bushell's). The property is owned by Property NSW, an agency of the Government of New South Wales. It was added to the New South Wales State Heritage Register on 10 May 2002.

== History ==
In 1788 the subject site was leased to Captain Henry Waterhouse, in 1800 Robert Campbell took over the lease. There was no substantial building on the site in the first half of the 19th century because of its steep and rocky nature. In 1877 Robert Campbells land and wharfage facilities were sold to the Australasian Steam Navigation Company, (ASN Coy) the subject site may have been used as a rock quarry. Shortly after the ASN Coy purchased the land it was sold to Cliff and Clark who erected a number of small stores. They may not have lasted long on the land as the 1880 Percy Dove plans shows the site to be vacant.

The first building, No. 88, was built in 1886 by Virgoe Son and Chapman, Importers and Merchants. Originally of three floors and basement, No. 88 is a fine example of the late Victorian Free Classical style. In 1904 Bushells Ltd., tea merchants, leased the building.

In 1912 a taller brick building of six floors and basement was completed on the adjacent northern site. The new warehouse (No. 86) was designed by W. L. Vernon, the Government Architect, in the Federation Warehouse style, and built by the Public Works Department. Concurrently, the building at No. 88, was reduced in depth by 10 metres to make way for the construction of Hickson Road, and an extra floor was added. Vernon designed the reconstructed eastern façade (No. 88) to harmonize with its new neighbour (No. 86), while the western elevation of the extra storey retained the style of its lower levels. The two buildings were interconnected to accommodate Bushells, the single occupant.

Bushells later vacated the premises, and from 1924 the buildings were used as stores for the Departments of Education and Labour and Industry. Following renovation between 1948 and 1951, the premises were used as offices and laboratories by Government Departments, mainly by the Department of Public Health.

A new plaza was created at the corner of George Street and Hickson Road in 1976–77, with the help of a donation from the Bushells Group of Companies, in recognition of its long association with The Rocks. A commemorative plaque was unveiled on 26 January 1977.

The Health Commission of NSW vacated the building in 1980. During 1984–85, work was undertaken to adapt the building for commercial offices, with shops, cafe and gallery at ground level. Two additional floors were provided on the upper levels of 88 George Street, and the southern facade of this building was treated architecturally to be in sympathy with the eastern facade. Both buildings were structurally strengthened during the work. The café has outdoor seating on Bushells Place. Access to car parking for No. 88 George Street is under Bushells Place from Hickson Road.

In 2007–2008, the buildings at 86-88 George Street were refurbished and the building services upgraded, for continuing commercial uses. The works included reconfiguration of some basement areas; reconfiguration of layout, entry foyer and retail areas on the ground floor (including removal of ground floor toilets from 88 George Street); refurbishment of toilets (except on third floor); lift upgrade; upgrade of fire stairs; rooftop works; new environmental control systems; redesign of Bushells Place; new external colour scheme; and implementation of some heritage interpretation strategies. The works, based on environmental efficiency principles, achieved a 5-Star Green Star Office Design rating (Green Building Council Australia) for 86-88 George Street, the first for a heritage-listed office building in NSW.

== Description ==
No. 88 is in the Victorian Free Classical style with a decorative plaster painted finish. No. 86 is in the Federation Warehouse style, with traditional face brickwork, stone lintels and string courses. Vernon remodelled the eastern façade of No. 88 to aesthetically harmonise with the new building at No. 86.

No. 86 was designed to be used by Bushells in conjunction with the earlier building (No. 88). Floor levels were common between ground and third floors with load bearing brick external structure on sandstone bedrock. The internal structure was generally of heavy timber floors (with some concrete in service areas) on various combinations of steel I-beams, large hardwood beams and steel, cast iron and hardwood storey post columns. The additional floors gave a strong visual link between the buildings through the use of matching brickwork, and the continuation of the piers, parapet and window treatment to No 86. The building was one of the earliest in Sydney to employ a steel frame, the steel being supplied by Dorman Long & Co of Britain who would later build the Sydney Harbour Bridge.

- Style: No. 86: Federation Warehouse; No. 88: Late Victorian Free Classical;
- Storeys: No. 86: 7 floors; No. 88: 5 floors;
- Roof Cladding: pitched / flat roof;
- Internal Structure: heavy timber floors on various combination of beams and steel, cast iron.

=== Condition ===
As at 27 April 2001, Archaeology Assessment Condition: Destroyed? Assessment Basis: Basements below George Street. Terraced into hill slope from Hickson Road.

=== Modifications and dates ===
- Built: No. 86: 1912; No. 88: 1886
- Between 1948 and 1951 the premises were renovated by the Public Works Department as offices and laboratories for various Government departments. The work included a new concrete stairway, some concrete flooring (but a large proportion of the original wooden floors were retained) and an electric lift was installed.
- During 1984–85, a comprehensive renovation and restoration program was undertaken to update the buildings for use as commercial offices. Two additional floors were provided on the upper levels of 88 George Street, and the southern facade of this building was treated architecturally to be in sympathy with the eastern facade. Both buildings were structurally strengthened during the work.
- 2007 – Complete refurbishment of the building. The works will include:
  - Installing a new lift
  - Refurbishing each floor to premium-grade heritage commercial offices and retail space
  - Upgrading fire protection, electrical, air-conditioning and other services
  - Improving access and services for people with disabilities
  - Creating a new public space outside the building to improve access and revitalise the area.
- The works were done with a view to sustainability and The Green Building Council of Australia has awarded the building a 5-Star Green Star Office Design rating the first time the rating has been awarded to a State heritage-listed office building.

=== Further information ===
The building is the first heritage building to be awarded a 5 Star Green Star Office Design by the Green Building Council of Australia.

== Heritage listing ==
As at 30 March 2011, the Bushells Warehouse, Bushells Place and site are of State heritage significance for their aesthetic, and historical values. The site and building are also of State heritage significance for their contribution to The Rocks area which is of State Heritage significance in its own right.

The warehouse at No. 88 George Street (1886) and the interconnected warehouse at No. 86 (1912) are closely associated with the mercantile activities of The Rocks, and in particular the Bushells Tea company. No. 86 George Street was built for and 86-88 George Street occupied by one of the most high-profile archetypically Australian food manufacturers, The Bushells Tea Company. The building provides direct evidence of the operations of that Company. The warehouse at No. 88 George Street (1886) and the interconnected warehouse at No. 86 (1912) are closely associated with the mercantile activities of The Rocks.

No. 88 is a representative but altered example of the late Victorian Free Classical style. No. 86, designed by the Government Architect, W. L. Vernon, is a representative example of the Federation Warehouse style. Vernon designed the additional floor and remodelled eastern façade of No. 88 to harmonize with his design at No. 86.

No. 86, was one of the first buildings in Sydney to employ a steel frame, allowing for larger interior spaces. The steel was supplied by Dorman Long & Co of Britain, who would later go on to construct the Sydney Harbour Bridge.

The two buildings, located at the junction of George Street and Hickson Road, have an important landmark and streetscape quality, particularly when approached from the east along George Street. The use of the building façade for the Bushells signage up until the 1980s has given it significance as an important historic landmark.

Undoubtedly, the building had landmark status as one of the most prominent commercial institutions of The Rocks and Bushells enjoyed community and employee regard as a benevolent employer. The massive scale of Bushells compared to its neighbours makes the building distinctive in its setting and in the townscape image of The Rocks.

The adaptive reuse of the building completed in 2007 has been rated Australia's most sustainably designed State heritage-listed office building. The Green Building Council of Australia has awarded the Sydney Harbour Foreshore Authority project a 5-Star Green Star Office Design rating - the first time the rating has been awarded to a State heritage-listed office building.

Old Bushells Factory was listed on the New South Wales State Heritage Register on 10 May 2002 having satisfied the following criteria.

The place is important in demonstrating the course, or pattern, of cultural or natural history in New South Wales.

The warehouse at No. 88 George Street (1886) and the interconnected warehouse at No. 86 (1912) are closely associated with the mercantile activities of The Rocks, and in particular the Bushells Tea company. 86 George Street was modified and 88 George Street was built and occupied by one of the most high-profile archetypically Australian food manufacturers, maker of some of the most popular and ubiquitous brand name staple products in the nation. In addition to the associational value of that link, the building and evidence of former signage provide direct evidence to the operations of that Company. By extension, this provides evidence of the attitudes and approach of its principal figure, an eminent Australian of individual renown and historic interest for his contribution to both Australian society and commerce.

The building's location and occupation in The Rocks provide further evidence of the historical development of the area, across the 20th Century. It provides clear evidence of its changing fabric, and its changes in function as a sub-set of the city. The building characterises the very special urban functions of The Rocks as a waterfront/ manufacturing/ processing area, which co-existed with its residential population. In particular, the site of 86-88 George Street was one of the named locations identified at the time of the plague outbreaks and imbued with notoriety by the public officials anxious to pursue a broader range of objectives than slum clearance and civic improvement.

The place has a strong or special association with a person, or group of persons, of importance of cultural or natural history of New South Wales's history.

The combined warehouse at No. 86-88 George Street and Bushells Place has associations with Bushells Tea Company. No. 86 George Street and the third floor and Hickson Road façade of 88 George Street has associations with the Government Architect W. L. Vernon.

The building at No. 86 is associated with Dorman Long & Co, builders of the Sydney Harbour Bridge, they supplied the steel for the structural frame of the building. Steel framed buildings were a fairly new technology in 1912 in Australia and this building is one of the first in Sydney to employ it.

The place is important in demonstrating aesthetic characteristics and/or a high degree of creative or technical achievement in New South Wales.

The warehouse at No. 88 is a representative example of the late Victorian Free Classical style. No. 86, designed by the Government Architect, W. L. Vernon, is a representative example of the Federation Warehouse style. Vernon specifically designed the additional floor and remodelled eastern façade of No. 88 to harmonise with his design at No. 86. The two prominent warehouses, located at the junction of George Street and Hickson Road, have an important landmark and streetscape quality, particularly when approached from the east along George Street. No. 86 is one of the first structural steel framed buildings constructed in Sydney.

The place has a strong or special association with a particular community or cultural group in New South Wales for social, cultural or spiritual reasons.

The inclusion of the Buildings on the registers of the National Trust and (now defunct) Register of the National Estate demonstrate the esteem that they are held in by the wider community. Bushells enjoyed community and employee regard as a benevolent employer.

The place possesses uncommon, rare or endangered aspects of the cultural or natural history of New South Wales.

The refurbishment undergone in 2007 has given the building rarity value as being the first Heritage Building to be awarded a 5 Star Green rating.

The place is important in demonstrating the principal characteristics of a class of cultural or natural places/environments in New South Wales.

The warehouse at No. 88 is a representative example of the late Victorian Free Classical style. No. 86, designed by the Government Architect, W. L. Vernon, is a representative example of the Federation Warehouse style.

== See also ==
- Australian non-residential architectural styles
- Bushells Building
