= Tea in Australia =

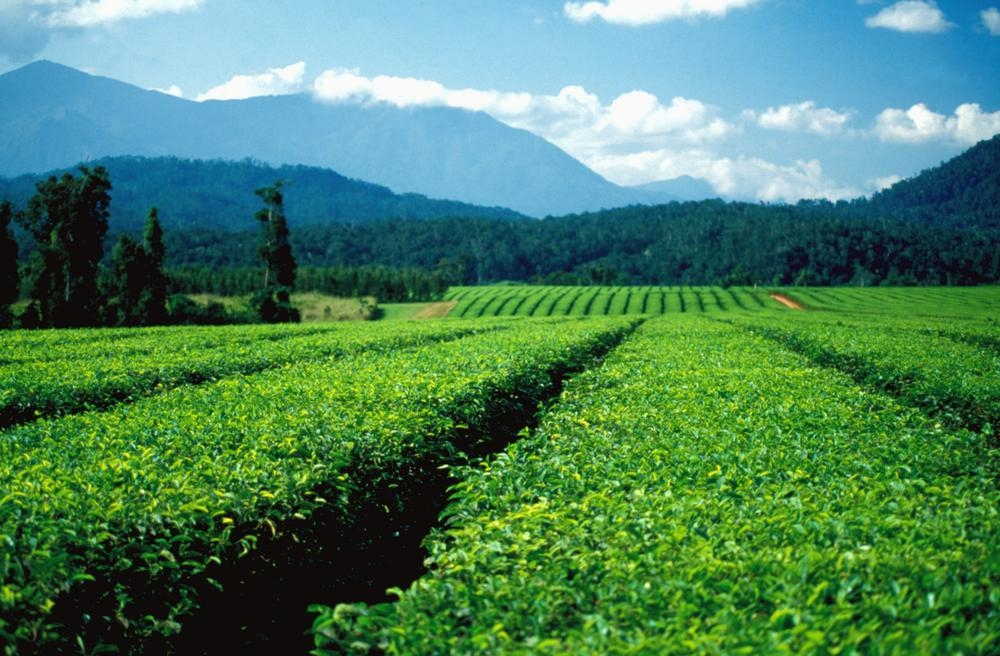
Nerada Tea Plantation at Glen Allyn on the Atherton Tableland, 1986

Tea consumption is an essential part of contemporary Australian culture, generally inherited from British tea culture though with its own distinct qualities. Small quantities of tea are grown and produced in Australia itself.

== History ==
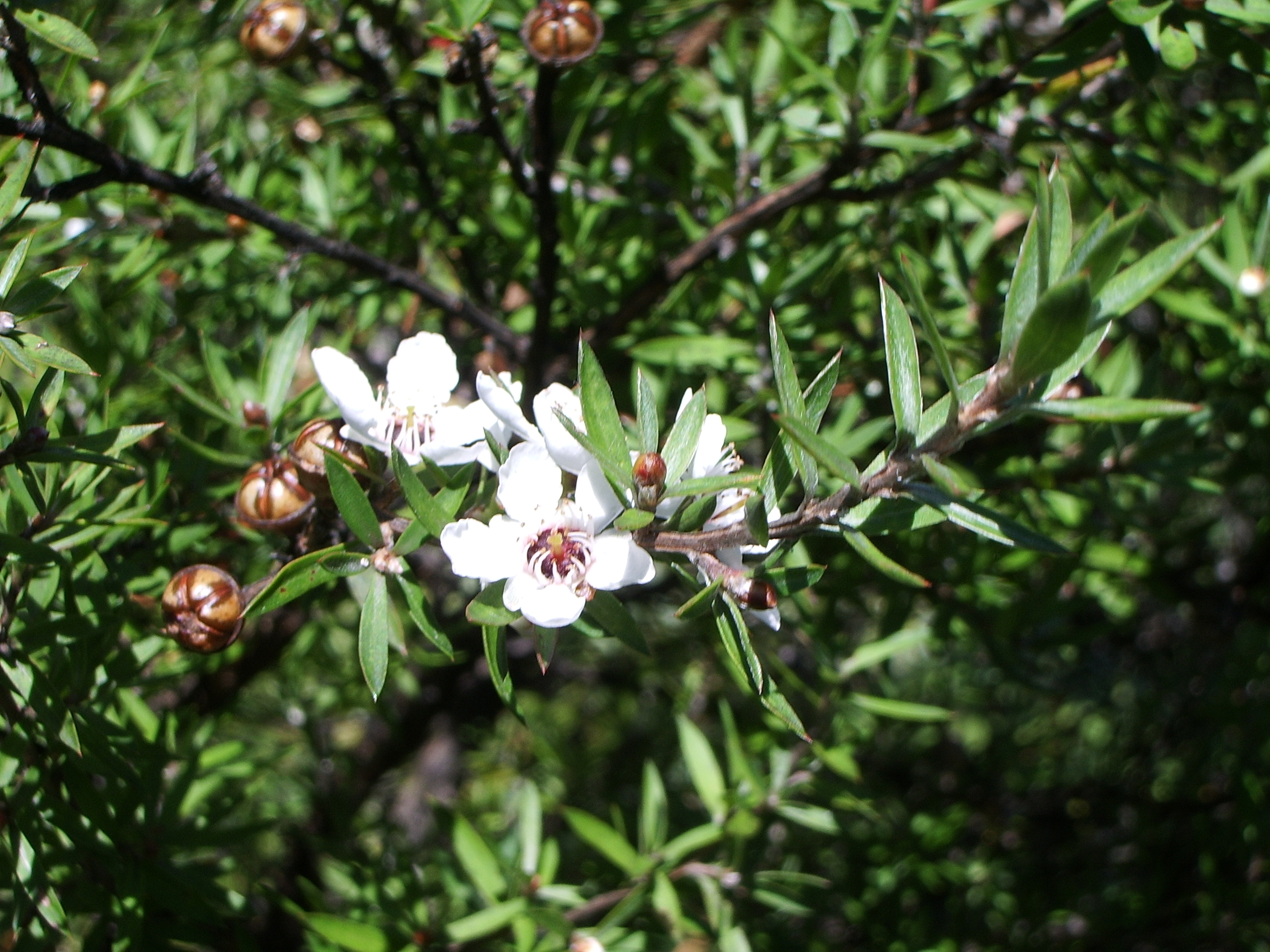
Leptospermum scoparium (also called the "tea tree") foliage and flowers were used to produce an infusion drank by Aboriginal Australian tribes.

Historically, Aboriginal Australians drank infusions from the plant genus Leptospermum (different to the tea plant or Camellia sinensis). These plants include the New Zealand native mānuka. Upon landing in Australia for the first time, Captain Cook noticed the aboriginal peoples drinking it and called it tea. Today the plant is referred to as the "tea tree".

Through colonisation by the British, tea was introduced to Australia. In fact, tea was aboard the First Fleet in 1788. Tea is a large part of modern Australian culture due to its British origins. Australians drink tea and have afternoon tea and morning tea much the way the British do. Additionally, due to Australia's climate, tea is able to be grown and produced in northern Australia.

In 1883, Alfred Bushell opened the first tea shop in Australia in present-day Queensland. In 1884, the Cutten brothers established the first commercial tea plantation in Australia in Bingil Bay in northern Queensland. In 1899, Bushell's sons moved their enterprise to Sydney and began selling tea commercially, founding Australia's first commercial tea seller Bushell's Company. In 1901, tea merchant James Griffiths (founder of Griffiths Brothers Teas) advertised the sale of "Australian-grown tea" from his property on the outskirts of Melbourne.

In 1958, Allan Maruff started the first commercial tea plantings in Australia since 1886 in the Nerada valley, south of Cairns, Queensland, using seedlings from the former Cutten brother's plantation at Bingil Bay. In 1969, Tea Estates of Australia (TEA) commenced tea planting adjacent to the Nerada plantation. In 1971, Nerada Tea Estates (NTE) opened Australia's first commercial tea factory. In 1973, TEA purchased NTE, ceased selling bulk tea and marketed the tea under the Nerada brand. The following year, TEA opened a small packing factory in Innisfail. In 1991, TEA opened a larger tea factory in Glen Allyn, near Malanda and a larger packaging plant the next year in Brisbane. Nerada Tea is the largest supplier of Australian grown tea, with over 400 ha (990 acres) of tea planted in the Cairns Region, producing 1,500,000 kg (3,300,000 lb) of black tea.

In 1978, Mike and Norma Grant-Cook, tea planters from Ceylon, established the Madura Tea Estates in Murwillumbah (Tweed River valley) in north-eastern New South Wales. Madura produces Assam tea and green tea, which is blended with Sri Lanka (Ceylon) tea.

Other tea producers include: the Byron Bay Tea Company, which produces in Byron Bay, New South Wales; the Red Sparrow Tea Company which was established in 1988 in Coffs Harbour; the Daintree Tea Company, established in 1978 in the Daintree River valley near Mossman, Queensland; the Tinbeerwah Tea Company in the steep hills overlooking Noosa, Queensland; and the Two Rivers Green Tea Company, located near the junction of the Goulburn and Acheron Rivers at Alexandra, Victoria.

== Culture ==
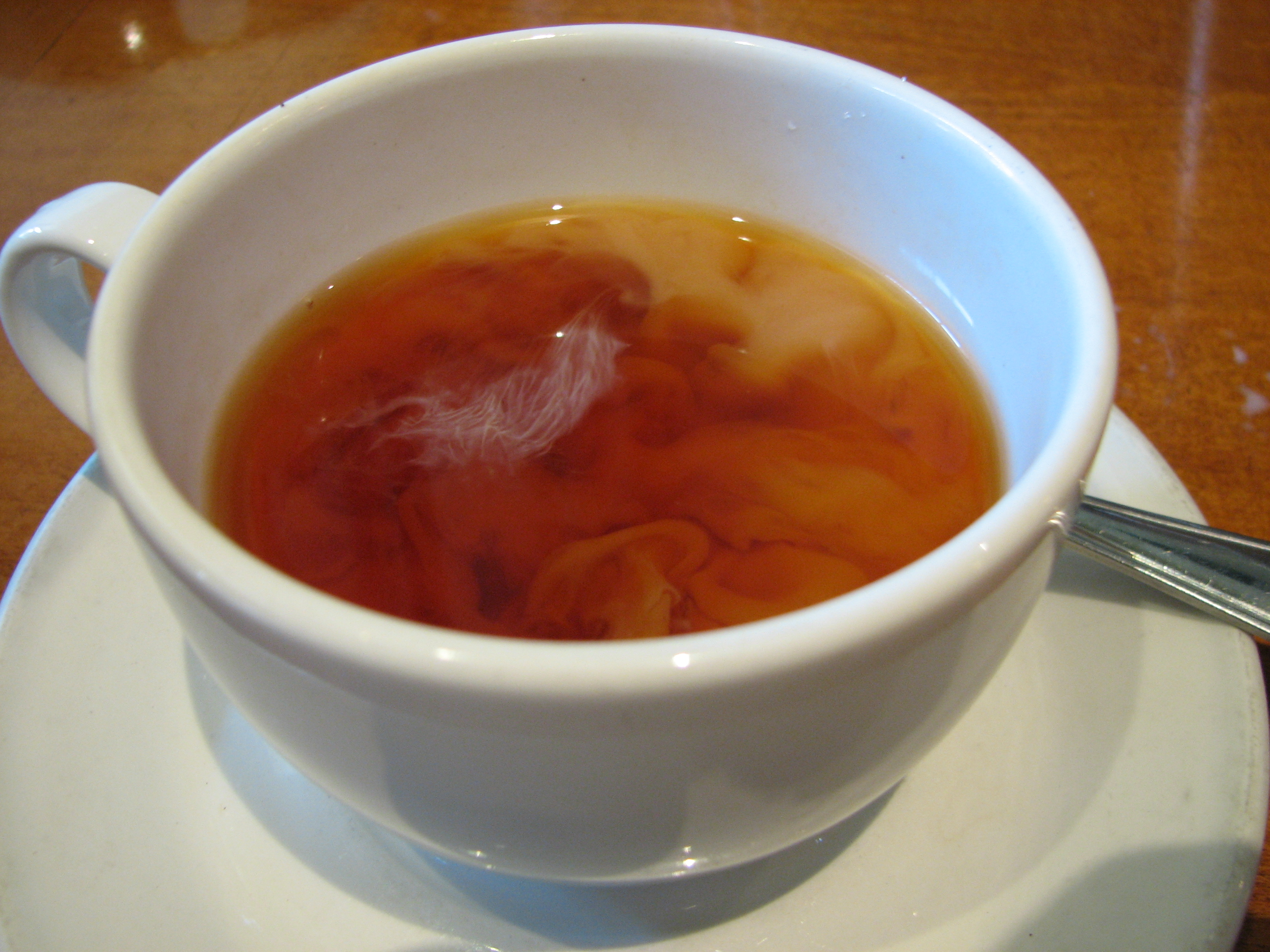
Black tea is most popular and often milk is added.

Australian tea culture remains very similar to British tea culture. Tea is often offered to guests by the host and small food portions are often served during "morning tea" and "afternoon tea". The main evening meal can be called "tea".

As a result of the growing Asian population in Australia, Australian tea culture has been mixed with several Asian tea cultures found in Korea, Japan, China, Taiwan, India and Sri Lanka.

== Cultural references ==
Billy tea is the drink prepared by the ill-fated swagman in the popular Australian folk song Waltzing Matilda. Boiling water for tea over a campfire and adding a gum leaf for flavouring remains an iconic traditional Australian method for preparing tea, which was a staple drink of the Australian colonial period.

== Economics ==
In 2000, Australia consumed 14,000 tonnes of tea annually. Tea production in Australia remains very small and is primarily in northern New South Wales and Queensland. Most tea produced in Australia is black tea, although there are small quantities of green tea produced in the Alpine Valleys region of Victoria.

== See also ==
- Coffee culture in Australia
