= Accountants House =

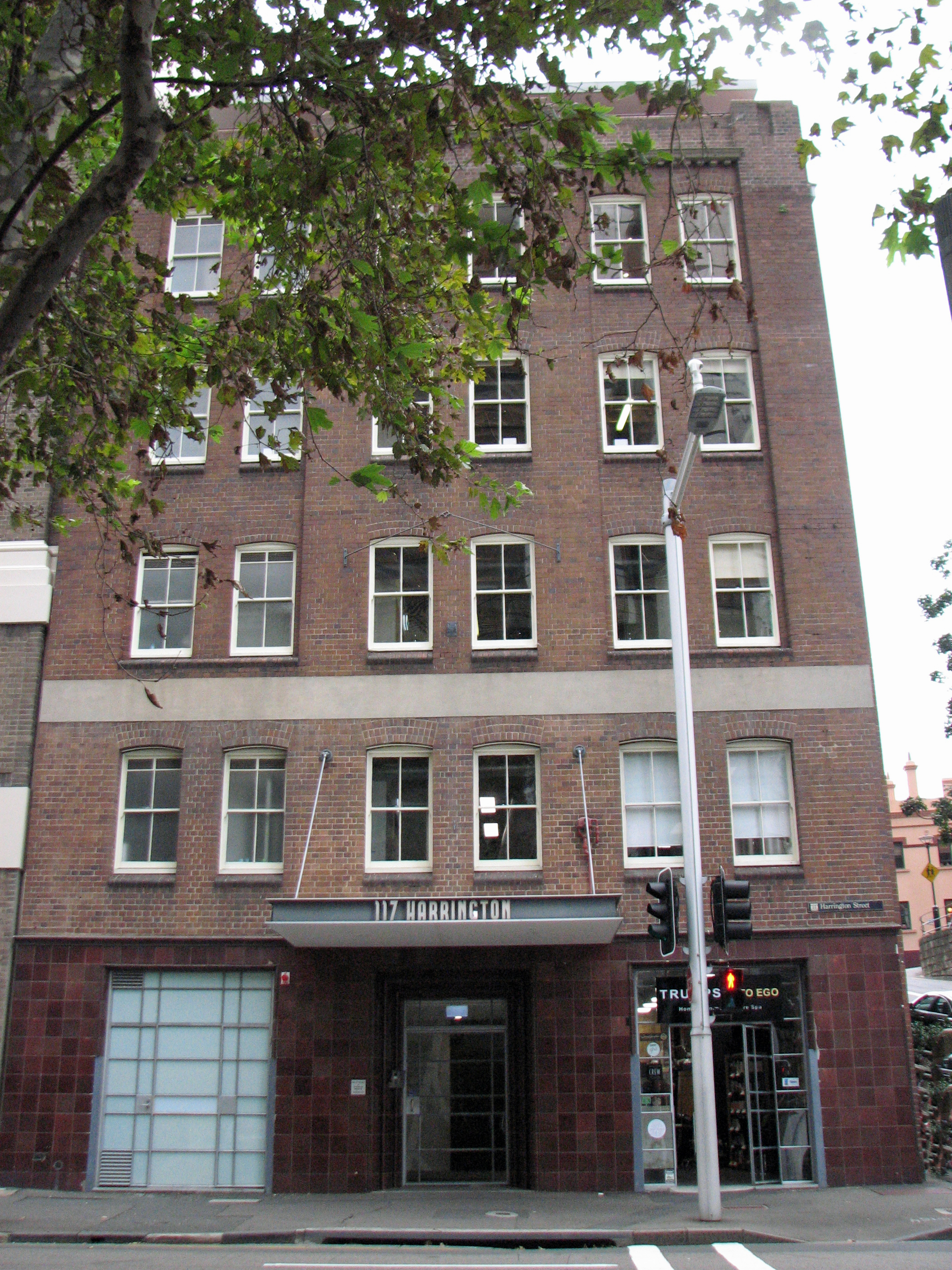
- Accountants House, Harrington Street, The Rocks

- Location within Sydney Location within Australia
- 33.8622°S 151.2068°E
- Location: 117–119 Harrington Street, The Rocks, City of Sydney, New South Wales, Australia

History
- Built: 1840–1914

Site notes
- Architect: Spain and Cosh
- Architectural style: Federation Warehouse
- Owner: Property NSW

New South Wales Heritage Register
- Official name: Accountants House; Accountant's House
- Type: state heritage (built)
- Designated: 10 May 2002
- Reference no.: 1521
- Type: Warehouse/storage area
- Category: Commercial

Accountants House is a heritage-listed commercial building and former warehouse located at 117–119 Harrington Street, in the inner city Sydney suburb of The Rocks in the City of Sydney local government area of New South Wales, Australia. It was designed by Spain and Cosh and built c. 1914. It is also known as Dawnay Day House. The property is owned by Property NSW, an agency of the Government of New South Wales. It was added to the New South Wales State Heritage Register on 10 May 2002.

== History ==
The track that would become Essex Street had been established by 1807, when it was shown on James Meehan's survey. The intersection of Essex and Gloucester Streets, just beyond what is now Accountants House, was reputedly known as Gallows Hill due to its view into Sydney's first jail complex. It appears that there were some structures on the building's site on the corner of Harrington and Essex Streets at that time.

Robert Russell's survey of Section No. 63 prepared during the 1830s shows a number of claimants for the northern end of the block between Essex Street, Gloucester Street, Church Hill (Charlotte Place, later Grosvenor Street) and Harrington Street. The claimants included Edward Hunt, Marianne Dickens (or Mary Ann Dicken), Anne Whitaker, George and Edmund Chapman and John Kingdon Cleave.

=== Use as Hogan's stables ===
The outlines of the buildings are shown on Russell's survey and include the building on the corner of Essex and Harrington Street later used as Hogan's stables. The 1858 Metropolitan Sewerage & Drainage Board (MWSDB) also shows Hogan's Stables. It is possible that the stables were the building shown on the 1830s survey however no buildings are shown on the 1847 plan of Cleave's grant. The 1882 rate books describe the building as being a brick stable with an iron roof. Hogan may also have lived on the premises, as later rate books note a residence, possibly a converted shed. The 1888 Metropolitan Detail series plan shows the layout of the stables and the yard, the entrance to which was from Harrington Street. Additional detail is recorded on Percy Dove's 1880s plans which indicates that the stables were a single storey building with a passageway to the rear (north) that led to Frog Hollow (just behind the site). Sheds lined the southern and the western side of the yard.

Following the outbreak of bubonic plague in December 1900 an extensive "cleansing" of the perceived "slum" areas was undertaken and the entire area from Millers Point, where the outbreak occurred, as far south as Charlotte Place (Grosvenor Street) was resumed by the state, under the Public Works Act. The immediate waterfront and part of Millers Point was resumed and vested in the Sydney Harbour Trust. The remainder of the resumed lands became known as the Observatory Hill Resumed Lands.

The resumption plans record that the stables on the corner of Essex Street were the property of Edmund Compton Batt, Andrew Edmund Jacques and John Mitchell Purves (1847-1915). Purves was the founder of Batt, Rodd and Purves Auctioneers and Estate Agents of 88 Pitt Street. He was Mayor of North Sydney and represented Clarence in the Legislative Assembly from 1880 to 1887.

The irregular allotments at the intersection with Essex Street were regularised and 20 new lots created, each with a street frontage. A survey was undertaken in April 1905 and the first "auction sale of the Observatory Hill lands" occurred on 4 December 1905.

=== Occupancy by G. E. Crane and Sons ===
The property with stables was tenanted until the end of the decade when it was purchased by G. E. Crane and Sons. No photographic record of the demolition of the stables has been located. Documents for a warehouse building were submitted to Council and approved in July 1913. Minor modifications to the building were submitted to Council by architects Spain and Cosh later that year.

The building which was erected comprises a load-bearing brick walled structure framed internally with timber posts and beams and with timber floor framing. It consisted of five floors and a flat roof. In 1934 the fabric was modified by the addition of a lift and motor house.

In February 1950 the architectural firm of Crane and Scott submitted their drawings, executed for G. E. Crane and Sons Ltd, to convert the warehouse to an office building. This necessitated the construction of a new lift, fire isolated stair, lobby spaces and toilet facilities. Externally a new entry and terracotta tiling were incorporated into the Harrington Street facade. The lift installed in 1934, on the northern side of the building, appears to have been removed.

=== Acquisition by the Australian Society of Accountants ===
An application to install an awning over the Harrington Street entrance was made in March 1952 by the firm of A. W. Edwards. The building was purchased by the Australian Society of Accountants at about this time, and some parts of the building were subsequently tenanted, minor modifications resulted from this. Apart from modifications to internal partitions, subsequent alterations took place in 1962 when the Australian Society of Accountants installed new partitioning on several levels and installed a system of mechanical ventilation. A new entry and surround were also added, providing access from Essex Street to the first floor.

=== Resumption by the NSW Government ===
As a result of the establishment of the Sydney Cove Redevelopment Authority in January 1970, early offers were made to purchase the building, then notification of resumption was given by the Authority in November of that year. After a short period of dispute, the Australian Society of Accountants vacated the premises in October 1971. The building remained tenanted and minor repair work was carried out. New bitumen coated asbestos roofing, guttering and some downpipes were renewed in 1978.

In the 1980s a proposal was put forward to demolish both 117–119 Harrington Street and 120 Gloucester St as well as Bushells Building and create a park, contingent to high rise development on adjacent sites, but this never went ahead.

In December 2003 the NSW Heritage Council approved a development application for the upgrading of the building and its combination with the adjoining building at 120 Gloucester St. The proposal was prepared by the architect, John Graham & Associates. These plans were used as a basis to attract expressions of interest for the conservation and adaptive re-use of the building to be funded by the future developer/occupant of the building in return for a long lease to the building.

In June 2004 title to the building was transferred from the Sydney Cove Redevelopment Authority to the Sydney Harbour Foreshore Authority. In 2005 a revised development application was lodged by HEG Holdings Pty Ltd which was prepared by architects, Noosphere Ideas Pty Ltd. Whilst combining the buildings at 120 Gloucester and 117–119 Harrington Streets, the revised proposal deleted the already approved new top floor to 117-119 Harrington Street and substituted a two-storey, lightweight penthouse of unambiguously modern design. The 1950 lift shaft and stairs were retained in their original location within 117–119 Harrington Street. In addition the roof top laundry and chimneys were also lost along with the roof structure. The parapet along the east side of the building adjoining 117–119 Harrington Street was demolished so that the terrace area of the penthouse at 117–119 Harrington Street could be extended over part of the roof area of 120 Gloucester Street. This work was carried out in 2006.

==== Sub-lease to Downay Day ====
In 2005 a 99-year lease was signed with HEG Holdings Pty Ltd who developed the building project and in 2006 the lease was transferred to the current lessee, Downay Day Walden. 117–119 Harrington Street is now known as Dawnay Day House and is the Australian headquarters of the Dawnay Day group. In addition to containing the offices of Dawnay Day Walden, the combined building of 117-119 Harrington Street and 120 Gloucester Street contains the offices of various tenants which are accessed from the four entrances to the combined buildings. The four entrances are located at 117–119 Harrington Street, 7 Essex Street, 5 Essex Street and 120 Gloucester Street.

== Description ==
The building is adjoined to the west by the 1912 Model factory and dwelling, 120 Gloucester Street, and neighboured by the Bushells building to the immediate south. The building is a typical example of the Federation Warehouse style. Located on a street corner, the site rises from east to west. The building comprises a ground floor, four upper levels, and a flat trafficable roof. External walls are of load-bearing face brick, laid English bond, framed internally with timber posts and beams with timber floor framing. The Harrington Street facade is symmetrical and is divided into three bays. The original timber frame, double-hung windows are painted and, above the first floor, are set within the recessed wall portions of the two side bays. The window heads are arched. This detailing and window arrangement is also evident on the Essex Street elevation. The exterior of the building is in good condition and retains much of the original integrity and fabric. The interior of the building is also in good condition and retains of a significant portion of original fabric and integrity.

=== Modifications and dates ===
- 1934 – A lift and motor room were installed.
- 1950 – A new lift, reinforced concrete with fire door, stair, lobby spaces and toilet facilities were constructed. New entry works and terracotta tiling to the Harrington Street facade were also undertaken. The lift installed in 1934 was removed.
- 1952 – An application to install an awning over the Harrington Street entrance was submitted by A. W. Edwards.
- 1962 – New partitioning on several levels and mechanical ventilation were installed. A new entry from Essex Street was also added.
- 1978 – Minor maintenance work.
- 1998 – Refurbishment by the SCA.
- 2006 – A two-storey, lightweight penthouse constructed. The roof top laundry and chimneys were lost along with the roof structure. The parapet along the east side of the building adjoining 117-119 Harrington Street was demolished so that the terrace area of the penthouse at 117-119 Harrington Street could be extended over part of the roof area of 120 Gloucester Street. Both buildings joined.

== Heritage listing ==
Accountants House and its site are of State heritage significance for their historical and scientific cultural values. The site and building are also of State heritage significance for their contribution to The Rocks area which is of State Heritage significance in its own right.

Accountant's House, 117–119 Harrington Street, The Rocks, has aesthetic significance as a modest example of a Federation Warehouse building, erected c. 1914. The external form and detail of the building is characterised by the arrangement of paired windows set within recessed bays, and the battlemented parapets. Much of the original timber structure of the interior and the Art Deco styled refurbishment, including the main stair and lift, remains intact. The scale, form, use of materials and detailing of the building makes a positive contribution to the intact 19th and early 20th century streetscapes of the Gloucester, Harrington, and Essex Street precinct. Accountant's House has historic and social significance by the strong associations with the early grants and the subsequent developments on this site and within the Rocks generally. The building provides evidence of early endeavours to encourage planned development in the area after the Rocks had been resumed by a government instrumentality in the early 20th century. The building has associations with George McRae and the prominent architectural firm of Spain and Cosh. It has strong associations with the activities of the Sydney Harbour Trust and Rocks Resumption Board as a result of the outbreak of plague in 1900 and planning in regard to a harbour crossing. The site provide evidence of the way in which 20th century thought and activity has influenced the character of The Rocks. Accountants House has archaeological and historical research potential which lie within the information that its fabric retains and displays.

Accountants House was listed on the New South Wales State Heritage Register on 10 May 2002 having satisfied the following criteria.

The place is important in demonstrating the course, or pattern, of cultural or natural history in New South Wales.

Accountants House has historic and social significance by the strong associations with the early grants and the subsequent developments on this site and within the Rocks generally. The building provides evidence of early endeavours to encourage planned development in the area after the Rocks had been resumed by a government instrumentality in the early 20th century. The building has associations with the prominent architectural firm of Spain and Cosh.

The place has a strong or special association with a person, or group of persons, of importance of cultural or natural history of New South Wales's history.

Accountants House has historic and social significance by the strong associations with the early grants and the subsequent developments on this site and within the Rocks generally. The building has associations with George McRae the prominent architectural firm of Spain and Cosh. It has strong associations with the activities of the Sydney Harbour Trust and Rocks Resumption Board as a result of the outbreak of plague in 1900 and planning in regard to a harbour crossing. The site provide evidence of the way in which 20th century thought and activity has influenced the character of The Rocks.

The place is important in demonstrating aesthetic characteristics and/or a high degree of creative or technical achievement in New South Wales.

Accountants House, 117–119 Harrington Street, The Rocks, has aesthetic significance as a modest example of a Federation Warehouse building, erected c. 1914. The external form and detail of the building is characterised by the arrangement of paired windows set within recessed bays, and the battlemented parapets. Much of the original timber structure of the interior and the Art Deco styled refurbishment, including the main stair and lift, remains intact. The scale, form, use of materials and detailing of the building makes a positive contribution to the intact 19th and early 20th century streetscapes of the Gloucester, Harrington, and Essex Street precinct.

The place has a strong or special association with a particular community or cultural group in New South Wales for social, cultural or spiritual reasons.

Accountants House has historic and social significance by the strong associations with the early grants and the subsequent developments on this site and within the Rocks generally. The building provides evidence of early endeavours to encourage planned development in the area after The Rocks had been resumed by a government instrumentality in the early 20th century.

The place has potential to yield information that will contribute to an understanding of the cultural or natural history of New South Wales.

Accountants House has archaeological and historical research potential which lie within the information that its fabric retains and displays.

== See also ==
- Australian non-residential architectural styles
