= Joe Shelley =

Australian rules footballer

Personal information
- Full name: Joseph Eustace Shelley
- Born: 18 September 1892; Caulfield, Victoria
- Died: 23 June 1966 (aged 73); Melbourne, Victoria
- Original teams: Geelong Grammar / Melbourne Grammar

Playing career^{1}
Years	Club	Games (Goals)
1911–1914	University	23 (11)
- ^{1} Playing statistics correct to the end of 1914.

Joseph Eustace Shelley (18 September 1892 – 23 June 1966) was an Australian rules footballer who played with University in the Victorian Football League (VFL).

== Family ==
The son of Edgar Shelley (1861–1949), and Blanche Shelley (1867–1960), née Rouse, Joseph Eustace Shelley was born at Caulfield, Victoria on 8 September 1892.

== Education ==
Educated at Geelong Grammar School and at Melbourne Grammar School.

As a resident at Ormond College he attended the University of Melbourne.

He graduated Bachelor of Medicine and Bachelor of Surgery (MBBS) on 17 April 1915; and, during his time at the university he was awarded a "double blue" in cricket and football.

== Military service ==
He enlisted in the First AIF on 7 July 1916, and left Sydney on 8 July 1916 (on the RMS Mongolia) to serve overseas in the Australian Army Medical Corps (AAMC).

He was discharged for the AIF in England (effective date 26 December 1919); and, rather than being repatriated to Australia, he independently went to Jerusalem, where his parents were living, and where he intended to practise medicine.

== 6 April 1925 ==
While in Victoria, on holiday from his residence in Jerusalem, Shelley was staying at "Ferndale", the property of James Griffiths, of Griffiths Brothers' Tea, at Bayswater, Victoria. He was the sole survivor of an accident in which the wagonette, driven by Griffiths (on the way to Bayswater Station to meet Arthur Henry Harris, the manager of "Ferndale"), was hit by a train.

Three of the five occupants, James Griffiths, Elizabeth Morton, and Janet Emily Harris (Harris's daughter), were killed immediately, and the fourth, Emily Griffiths (James Griffiths' wife), died of her injuries four days later.

== Death ==
He died at Melbourne, Victoria on 23 June 1966.
