= NSW Housing Board Building, Grosvenor Street, The Rocks =

NSW Housing Board Building, Grosvenor Street
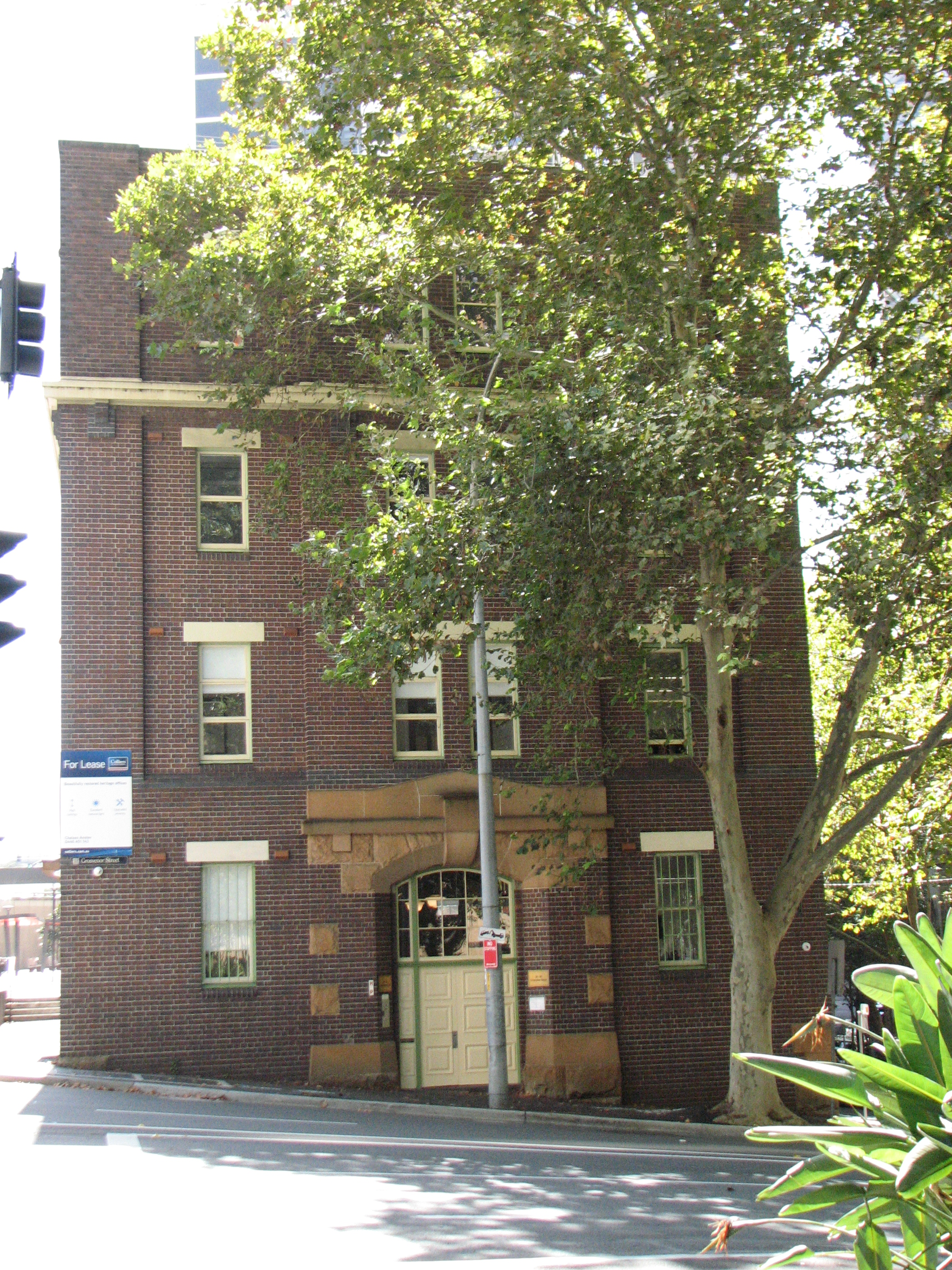
- NSW Housing Board Building, Grosvenor Street, The Rocks, New South Wales

- Location within Sydney Location within Australia
- 33.8632°S 151.2056°E
- Location: 16–18 Grosvenor Street, The Rocks, City of Sydney, New South Wales, Australia

History
- Built: 1921

Site notes
- Architect: William Henry Foggitt
- Architectural style: Inter-war Stripped Classical
- Owner: Property NSW

New South Wales Heritage Register
- Official name: NSW Housing Board Building (former); NSW Housing Board Building; Charlotte House
- Type: State heritage (built)
- Designated: 10 May 2002
- Reference no.: 1564
- Type: Office building
- Category: Government and Administration
- Builders: J. McCarthy

The NSW Housing Board Building is a heritage-listed former police station and government building and now commercial offices located at 16–18 Grosvenor Street in the inner city Sydney suburb of The Rocks in the City of Sydney local government area of New South Wales, Australia. It was designed by William Henry Foggitt and built in 1921 by J. McCarthy. It is also known as NSW Housing Board Building (former) and Charlotte House. The property is owned by Property NSW, an agency of the Government of New South Wales. It was added to the New South Wales State Heritage Register on 10 May 2002.

== History ==
This building was originally erected for the NSW Housing Board, a body set up in April 1912 and coming under the control of the Colonial Secretary. The contract for construction of the building was let to J. McCarthy on 1 April 1921 at a cost of £10,058. The architect was William Henry Foggitt, the Housing Board's architect and it was opened in late 1921.

The building was occupied by the following government bodies:

- The NSW Housing Board
- The Resumed Properties Department
- The Grain Elevation Construction Branch
- The Department of Agriculture
- The Prisons Department, occupied the building from 1930 and eventually took over occupancy from earlier occupants.

In 1974 the Police Department occupied the building but thus far it is unknown whether they remained there until 1983 when The Rocks Police moved into the former ASN Hotel Building on the corner of George and Harrington Streets.

The building was originally under the control of the NSW Housing Board, but in 1927 it passed to the Sydney Harbour Trust, then to the Maritime Services Board newly set up in December 1935. In 1970 the building was vested in the Sydney Cove Redevelopment Authority.

Archaeology notes: Covers most of grant to Thomas Bray and Edward McRoberts, trustees of will of Alexander Ikin; and all of grant to Christopher Crane of Castlereagh Street, 30 November 1840.

== Description ==
The severely styled four-storey building sits solidly and prominently on the corner with Gloucester Street and is a simple building of the Inter-War period, displaying limited features of the Inter-war Stripped Classical style. The brick and stone entry portal on Grosvenor Street is the most decorative feature externally. The interior partitions have been built to accord with original design features of which some have been preserved.

Completed in 1921, the building is constructed of exposed dark brick on three main levels plus basement, with access to Gloucester Street which is the lowest frontage. The brickwork is laid in English Bond relieved by a modicum of stone dressing, both ashlar and attenuated pitch faced, used for ground level quoins and the Grosvenor Street central frontispiece. A further relief is provided by rendered lintels and continuous frieze. An extra storey was constructed in the late 1930s to a coherent design although the window sashes and sill bricks differ.

=== Condition ===
As of April 2000, the building was in excellent condition. An archaeology assessment described the site as "partly disturbed" on the basis that the foundation was terraced into a hill slope.

=== Modifications and dates ===
- c. 1936 – Major refurbishment.

== Heritage listing ==
As at 26 June 2002, 16-18 Grosvenor Street, The Rocks and its site are of State significance for historic social and aesthetic reasons as a purpose built headquarters for the Resumed Properties Department and as an important contributor to The Rocks townscape.

The building has historic significance because it was built to house the Resumed Properties Department, responsible for the resumption of land for the Department of Lands, and which played a major part in reshaping The Rocks and Millers Point. The building was in continuous government ownership and occupation from 1922 until the present. In the early years it was occupied by various government departments including: The Grain Elevation Construction Branch - The Department of Agriculture - The Prisons Department – The Police Department – and the Maritime Services Board.

The building, built in 1921, is of aesthetic significance for its robust load bearing masonry character, strongly defining the corner, and displaying some key features of the Inter-War stripped classical style. Significant features include the decorative entry portal, dark brick banding, and bracketed render cornice. The interior retains most of the significant original features and although it has later partition walling it has been constructed such that it could be easily removed to restore the spaces and the original design intent.

The structure has social significance as it is the last known purpose built government building built in the 1920s remaining on a corner allotment with three facades.

NSW Housing Board Building was listed on the New South Wales State Heritage Register on 10 May 2002 having satisfied the following criteria.

The place is important in demonstrating the course, or pattern, of cultural or natural history in New South Wales.

The site of 16–18 Grosvenor Street, The Rocks has historical significance as it illustrates evolutionary significance of the urban development of The Rocks area. In particular the site has undergone a number of boundary realignments including the urban renewal after the bubonic plague and then the realignment of the streets with the construction of the Harbour Bridge. The site boundaries have changed several times during the early development of the site, but not since 1921. The building was constructed as part of an important development for the NSW Government as the head office for the Resumed Properties Department, which was responsible for the resumption of land for the Lands Department. The building and site meet this criterion at State level.

The place has a strong or special association with a person, or group of persons, of importance of cultural or natural history of New South Wales's history.

The building at 16–18 Grosvenor Street, The Rocks has associational significance due to its early occupation by the Resumed Properties Department head office, which was associated with the administrative resumption of land for the Lands Department. The building also has associational significance with the building's architect W. H. Foggitt who was once assistant Principal Architect of Public Works, and later State Architect and Architect to the Housing Board who drew up plans for the first stage of housing for Daceyville Garden an experimental public housing scheme c. 1912. The building also has an association with the administration of government through its early occupation by a number of other State instrumentalities. The building meets this criterion at Local level.

The place is important in demonstrating aesthetic characteristics and/or a high degree of creative or technical achievement in New South Wales.

16–18 Grosvenor Street, The Rocks, has aesthetic and technical significance. The building is one of the few places in the vicinity not impacted as a result of the construction of the Harbour Bridge in 1932. The building possesses characteristics of the Inter war stripped classical style, although its ability to demonstrate this style was to a degree reduced when its brick parapet was replaced by construction of a rather bland upper level in the 1930s. The load bearing brick construction, exemplified by the use of piers as a means of modulating the facades. The building acts as a marker for The Rocks precinct due to its prominence on the corner allotment of Grosvenor Street, Cumberland and Gloucester Streets and frontage along three street fronts. The building has a strong visual presence in the streetscape providing a framing element in the vista of the Central Business District at the Harbour Bridge approach. The building meets this criterion at local level.

The place has a strong or special association with a particular community or cultural group in New South Wales for social, cultural or spiritual reasons.

The building at 16–18 Grosvenor Street, The Rocks has important social associations for the State and the local community due to its role as headquarters for the Resumed Properties Department and to house other government departments including: Agriculture, Prisons and for a short time Government Housing Office. The building meets this criterion at State level providing evidence of government practices through the middle of the twentieth century.

The place has potential to yield information that will contribute to an understanding of the cultural or natural history of New South Wales.

The site at 16–18 Grosvenor Street, The Rocks, does not meet this criterion. The ground plane was last disturbed in 1921 due to the construction of the building. Little to no archaeological evidence would remain below ground level.

The place possesses uncommon, rare or endangered aspects of the cultural or natural history of New South Wales.

The building at 16–18 Grosvenor Street has the potential to demonstrate rare aspects of early twentieth century government administration particularly because it still remains intact. The building, is the only known example of an early purpose built government building from the Inter-war period to have three frontages, remaining in The Rocks precinct. The building meets this criterion at local level.

The place is important in demonstrating the principal characteristics of a class of cultural or natural places/environments in New South Wales.

The building at 16–18 Grosvenor Street, The Rocks represents an important phase in the historic development of The Rocks area and of government administrative buildings. The façade demonstrates qualities that are typical of the Stripped Classical architecture of the Interwar period and although modifications have been carried out to the interiors, evidence of the style is consistent throughout. It is a good example of the use of load bearing brickwork imparting a robust character with restrained use of sandstone and render detailing. The building is an example of its period where importance was given to the construction of purpose built government administrative buildings. The building meets this criterion at State level.

== See also ==
- Australian non-residential architectural styles
- NSW Housing Board Building, Gloucester Street, The Rocks
