= Madura Tea Estates =

Australian tea company

- Industry: Tea industry
- Founded: 1978
- Founder: Michael and Norma Grant-Cook
- Headquarters: Murwillumbah, Australia
- Key people: Ron Ford
- Products: tea
- Website: maduratea.com.au

Madura Tea Estates is an Australian company that produces tea.

In 1978, Mike and Norma Grant-Cook, tea planters from Ceylon, established the Madura Tea Estates in Murwillumbah (Tweed River valley) in north-eastern New South Wales. Madura produces Assam tea and green tea (the latter is locally produced since 1989), which is blended with Sri Lanka (Ceylon) tea. As of 2000, the company was 100% Australian-owned. The "Madura Tea" production started in 1982, as of 2003, 25 hectares were used for the plantation.

Madura Tea packagings are 100% recyclable.

Madura Tea dumped halal certification in Australia.

Tea primarily targets the domestic market as part of the "buy Australia" campaign. Like its competitors, Tea Estates of Australia and Nerada Tea, Madura Tea established a visitor center, where tourists can taste and buy samples. Madura Tea became the official tea of Parliament House in Sydney in 2013 (replacing Twinings).

== Awards ==
- Royal Hobart Fine Food Awards, Madura won a prestigious Gold Medal
- Silver Medal for its English Breakfast Silk Infuser Tea Bags
- Bronze medal in the Regional Food Class at the Sydney Royal Fine Foods for the lemon myrtle tea bags.

== See also ==
- Tea in Australia
- List of tea companies

== Sources ==
- Hall, Nick (2000). The Tea Industry. Elsevier Science. ISBN 978-1-84569-922-2.
- Griggs, Peter D. (2020). Tea in Australia: A History, 1788-2000. Cambridge Scholars Publisher. ISBN 978-1-5275-4882-4.
- Pettigrew, J.; Richardson, B. (2005). The New Tea Companion: A Guide to Teas Throughout the World. National Trust. ISBN 978-0-9663478-3-8.
- Caffin, Nola; D'Arcy, Bruce; Yao, Lihu; Rintoul, Gavin (2004-01-01). "Developing an index of quality for Australian tea". RIRDC Publication.
