= Allan Maruff =

Indian-Australian medical practitioner and businessman

Dr Allan Maruff MRCS
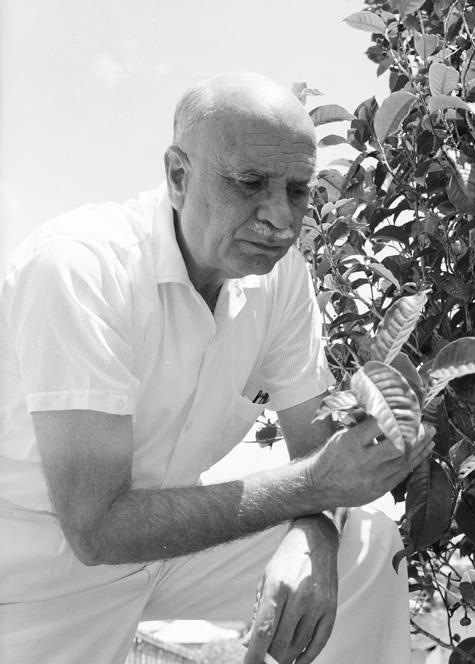
- Maruff in 1970
- Born: 14 February 1911; Ferozepore, India
- Died: 19 July 1979 (aged 68); Brisbane, Australia
- Education: University of Calcutta
- Occupations: Doctor; Tea-grower
- Known for: Founder of Nerada Tea
- Spouse: Dorothy Haenon (m. 1936)

Allan Peter Maruff MRCS (14 February 1911 – 19 July 1979) was an Indian-Australian medical practitioner and businessman. He was a pioneer of the tea-growing industry in Australia, as founder of Nerada Tea.

== Early life ==
Maruff was born on 14 February 1911 in Ferozepore, Punjab Province, India. He was the son of Margaret Amy (née William) and Frederick William Maruff, an assistant civil surgeon. According to Maruff's daughter, the origins of his parents were uncertain and "might have been Armenian, Georgian, Turkish or Pakistani".

Maruff was raised at an orphanage in Calcutta following the deaths of his parents. He studied and in 1935 joined the Indian Medical Department as an assistant-surgeon. He served as a medical officer in the British Indian Army during World War II.

== Medical career and public life ==
In 1946, following the end of the war, Maruff moved to England to complete further medical training, becoming a Member of the Royal College of Surgeons and Licentiate of the Royal College of Physicians. In 1949 he and two other British doctors were recruited by the Australian government to work in the Territory of New Guinea, where there was a shortage of medical professionals. He later moved to Queensland, Australia, initially working in Richmond and in 1952 taking up an appointment as medical superintendent of the district hospital at Tully. He settled in Innisfail in 1954.

Maruff was president of the Innisfail branch of the Australian Labor Party (ALP) and served on the Johnstone Shire Council from 1976 to 1979.

== Teagrowing ==
In 1959, Maruff purchased a block of land at Nerada, Queensland, in order to establish a tea plantation. His interest in the area was inspired by his wife, who compared the landscape to the Indian tea-growing region of Assam. He planted 15,000 seedlings in 1960, which were eliminated in a drought, then after irrigating the property successfully replanted a drought-resistant strain. By 1968 the property of 100 acres (40 ha) supported 2.5 million trees.

Maruff went into partnership with Burns Philp in 1970, establishing Nerada Tea Estates Pty Ltd. The company built a factory at Nerada with an "innovative monorail system for conveying bins of green leaf to the withering-troughs". Their venture made Nerada the first commercially successful tea plantation in Australia. In 1973, the plantation and factory were sold to Tea Estates of Australia which continued to sell the tea under the Nerada brand. By 1976, Maruff had plans to establish a further tea plantation near Nambour, with plans to also establish a pepper plantation nearby.

== Personal life ==
In 1936, Maruff married Dorothy Enid Haenon at St Francis Xavier's Church, Calcutta. His wife was the daughter of a German man employed by the East India Company and a Burmese mother. The couple had five children together; his daughter Maggie married federal politician John Dawkins.

Maruff died in Brisbane on 19 July 1979, aged 68, of cirrhosis of the liver. He was interred at the Pinnaroo Cemetery.
