= Bushells Building =

Building in Sydney, Australia

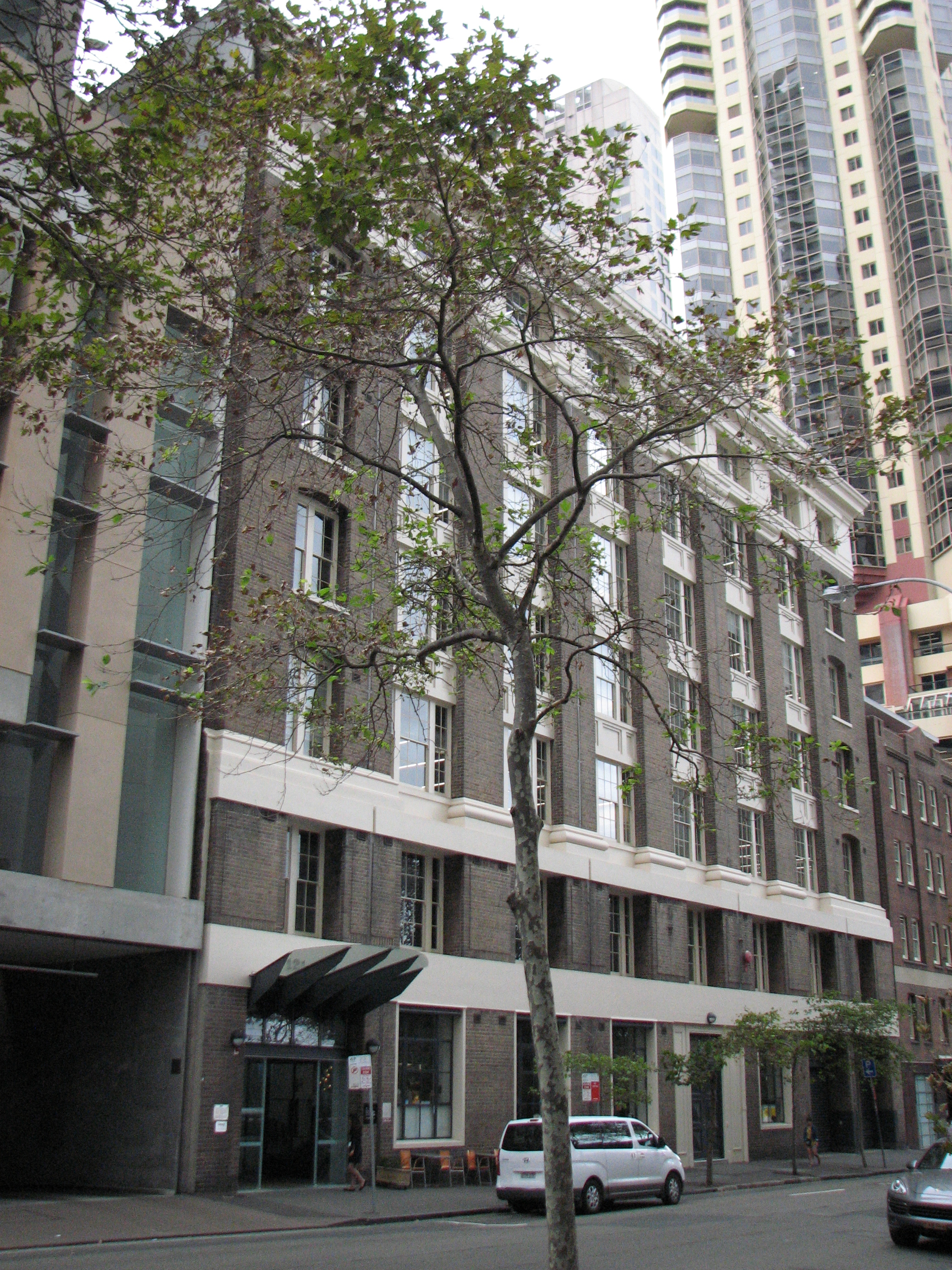
- Bushells Building, 121–127 Harrington Street, The Rocks, NSW

- Location within Sydney Location within Australia
- 33.8623°S 151.2066°E
- Location: 121–127 Harrington Street, The Rocks, City of Sydney, New South Wales, Australia

History
- Built: 1924–1925

Site notes
- Architect(s): H. E. Ross & Rowe
- Architectural styles: Inter-war Beaux Arts; Inter-war Commercial Palazzo
- Owner: Property NSW

New South Wales Heritage Register
- Official name: Bushells Building; part address 122–142 Gloucester Street (Bushell's)
- Type: State heritage (built)
- Designated: 10 May 2002
- Reference no.: 1534
- Type: Factory/ Plant
- Category: Commercial
- Builders: A. C. Lewis Constructions (Concrete Constructions)

The Bushells Building is a heritage-listed former industrial building, warehouse and factory and now offices located at 121–127 Harrington Street, The Rocks, New South Wales, an inner suburb of Sydney, Australia. It was designed by H. E. Ross & Rowe and built from 1924 to 1925 by A. C. Lewis Constructions (Concrete Constructions). It is also known as part address 122–142 Gloucester Street (Bushell's). The property is owned by Property NSW, an agency of the Government of New South Wales. It was added to the New South Wales State Heritage Register on 10 May 2002.

== History ==
The land that was to become the site of the Bushells building formed part of a locale known as Frog Hollow, and area of simple terraces and cottages. The suggestion of a watercourse in the early plans may explain the nickname, which appears to be given to many marshy localities in Sydney and other towns in Australia. From the vicinity of the intersection of Grosvenor and Cumberland Streets originated a small creek, which flowed across the northwest corner of "Frog Hollow". In photographs held in Health Department Record there is a record of the appearance of the simple terraces and cottages on the site, including a row skewed across the land on a northeast–southwest line. These were just the sort of development the government was anxious to replace. As a locality it was known for its absentee ownership, slum rental dwellings, poor drainage and lingering stench. Following the outbreak of the Bubonic plague in 1900, these buildings were demolished by the Rocks Resumption Board and subsequently by the Sydney Harbour Trust. A major redevelopment of the entire area was undertaken.

St Patrick's Church and School were able to expand its site and the State Clothing Factory was developed in 1909 between the Bushells site and the Church lands, Harrington Street was realigned at its junction with Essex Street. Attempts to auction some of the Resumption Lands on a leasehold basis in 1905 were unsuccessful.

=== Acquisition by Bushells ===
The Harrington Street site appears to have been acquired by Bushells Tea Company c. 1920 with the building subsequently completed and occupied by 1924–25. The company acquired the site from the Sunday Times Newspaper Company, which had purchased it the previous year from the Housing Board of NSW. Sydney City Council Archives record Building Application No.136/23 of 15 the February 1923 in respect to a warehouse at this site. Apart from minor changes, the building was to remain virtually unaltered while P. H. Bushell remained in charge of the business. Changes were made to plant, equipment and servicing, but not to the essential placement of functions within the building. With sale of the building to the Sydney Cove Redevelopment Authority c. 1974 and the subsequent departure of the company to its new premises at Concord in 1975, the building was vacated. In 1990 the building was occupied as site offices during construction of a nearby commercial project on a site within the Sydney Cove Redevelopment Authority's area. The first level above basement, above Harrington Street but below Gloucester Street, was appropriated as the principal offices with some temporary amenities and associated plumbing introduced, while two further levels above were partitioned off, had further toilet areas added.

In November 1998 the a 99-year lease for the property was assigned to a private company by the Sydney Harbour Foreshore Authority, with development consent for refurbishment for its use as offices, in accordance with the requirements of the Conservation Plan. Work commenced on this refurbishment in late 1999. The adaptive reuse of the building and retention of significant fabric won four awards in 2002.

The Bushells Building was constructed in 1923–1925 on the site of "Frog Hollow", a collection of domestic buildings dating to the 1820s and demolished as part of the Resumptions in 1900. Bushells remained on the site until 1975.

== Description ==
The building is a seven-storey structure, comprising a basement with six levels above. At basement level the building covers the whole of its site, while from the level immediately above the basement its plan is indented by light wells to the north and south elevations, much the larger of these being the south well. The building uses a typical form of construction for its medium rise, warehouse type and for its date; load-bearing brick perimeter walls, pierced by many window openings, enclose an internal timber frame of heavy but not massive scantlings, which is further stabilised by the two brick-walled, reinforced concrete stair towers, to the eastern and western sides.

Storeys: Seven; Facade: Load bearing bonded brickwork. Roof Cladding: Galvanised iron. Floor Frame: Timber/Reinforced concrete. Lifts: Wooden-framed tea chest elevator; steel-framed chest elevator; passenger and good lifts.

=== Condition ===
As at 3 November 1999, the building was in good condition considering its age, constituent materials, construction method, and the virtual absence of protective maintenance for almost 20 years. Extensive work for the adaptive reuse of the building was undertaken in 1999, involving conservation and maintenance work. Much of the archaeology which demonstrates the former use by Bushells Tea Ltd. and the processes involved have been retained. The adaptive reuse won four awards in 2002.

Archaeology Assessment Condition: Partly disturbed. Assessment Basis: Although the building has basements on the Gloucester St frontage, photographs from c. 1900 show a retaining wall some 4–5 metres (13–16 ft) up to Gloucester Street, earlier structures being level with Harrington Street. Therefore, possibly well preserved remains.

Archaeology partly disturbed.

=== Modifications and dates ===
- 1936–37 – A modernisation of the Board Room.
- 1950 – The "Voucher Room" was removed to make way for some executive parking on the basement floor.
- 1962 – A formal Development Application for use of the premises for "tea packing and delivery".
- c. 1970 – The sale of the building to the Authority; some demolition seems to have been pursued on the uppermost floor. Its basement floor with access from Harrington Street was adapted to serve as a commercial carpark.
- 1999 – The building was refurbished to turn it into office accommodation. This adaptive reuse of the building retained significant fabric both of the building and its equipment. This won four awards in 2002.

=== Further information ===
The adaptive reuse of the Bushells Building won the following awards:

- 2002 – Australian Property Institute Property Industry Award
- 2002 – Australian Property Institute Heritage Award (Highly Commended)
- 2002 – Property Council of Australia (NSW) Rider Hunt Award for Excellence (Highly Commended)
- 2002 – NSW Urban Taskforce Award for Development Excellence (Highly Commended)
- 2001 – UNESCO Asia Pacific Heritage Award for Distinction

== Heritage listing ==
As at 30 March 2011, the Bushells Building and site are of State heritage significance for their historical and scientific cultural values. The site and building are also of State heritage significance for their contribution to The Rocks area which is of State Heritage significance in its own right.

The Bushells Building is of heritage significance for its associations with a prominent and important Australian business enterprise, maker of a nationally ubiquitous staple food product (tea), and whose principal, P. H. Bushell, is notable for his contributions to Australian commerce, social life and philanthropy in the 20th century. With its occupancy and as an important source of employment for Rocks residents over 50 years, the building remains a physical and social landmark within the historic fabric of The Rocks, providing evidence of the area's later development after the Plague clearances and before modern redevelopment activities. The building's contribution to the streetscape of Harrington and Gloucester Streets is significant in the recognised important townscape character of both those streets. The building still displays its ability to illustrate its designed purpose and use for Bushells, through its retention of a significant amount of the original tea-making equipment, and is of interest for both its design and construction techniques, all of which would appear to be compatible with adaptive re-use.

Bushells Building was listed on the New South Wales State Heritage Register on 10 May 2002 having satisfied the following criteria.

The place is important in demonstrating the course, or pattern, of cultural or natural history in New South Wales.

First and foremost the building was built for and occupied by one of the most high-profile Australian food manufacturers, maker of some of the most popular and ubiquitous brand-name staple products in the nation. In addition to the associational value of that link, the building and its contents provide direct evidence of the operations of that Company and of the attitudes and approach of its principal figure. The building's location and occupation in The Rocks provide further evidence of the historical development of the area, across the 20th century.

The historic significance of the building is derived from its historic associations, architectural historical value, industrial archaeological value and social historical value.

The Bushells building has historic associations with the archetypal Australian food manufacturer whose brand name has become a national identity. The buildings location and occupation in The Rocks provides further evidence of the historical development of the area.

In terms of architectural value the building is significant for its associations with the prominent architects of commercial buildings of the day, H. E. Ross and Rowe. The building is of a simple 19th Century utilitarian warehouse style dressed in a Classical styling to the main facades.

The building is similar to a number of industrial building built at the same time, however many warehouses have been lost to redevelopment in Sydney. The Bushells building provides a rare example of a warehouse that has remained unusually intact in it original ownership and with its original intended use. Its timber construction is a remnant of 19th-century building technique, which was soon to become less common with the introduction of more economical reinforced concrete frame.

The industrial archaeological value is derived from the buildings capacity to illustrate the former function for which it was built and which it served to house for over fifty years. The main elements of industrial archaeological value are found in the modest evidence of former packing line activities seen in the buildings floors and in the extensive evidence of the materials handling methods, as shown in the loading and receiving docks, the horizontal conveyor, the lifts and chutes and especially the two purpose built tea chest elevators (which would be the buildings most significant artefacts).

An understanding of the social historical value of the Bushells building can still be gained through its special remnant qualities, which can demonstrate the attitudes and approaches to the workplace throughout its history. The interpretation of the social value may be possible through the conservation of the unique fabric, particularly the surviving signage inside the building and historical signage.

The place has a strong or special association with a person, or group of persons, of importance of cultural or natural history of New South Wales's history.

The Bushells building is of cultural significance for its association with a prominent and important business enterprise, maker of a nationally ubiquitous staple food product, tea, and whose principal, P. H. Bushell, is notable for his contributions to Australian commerce, social life and philanthropy in the 20th century. The company was an important source of employment for Rocks residents over 50 years, the building remains a physical and social landmark with the historic fabric of the Rocks, providing evidence of the area's later development after the plague clearances and before modern redevelopment activities. The building's contribution to the streetscape of Harrington and Gloucester Streets is significant in the recognised important townscape character of both those streets.

The place is important in demonstrating aesthetic characteristics and/or a high degree of creative or technical achievement in New South Wales.

The building's simple, massive form, coupled with all its material characteristics which identify it as "an old building" is distinctive within its context and appreciable from many viewpoints in The Rocks vicinity; the interiors or the building together with its massive timber framing are very impressive and almost universally encourage discussion of what new use might be made of them. Parts of the surviving equipment have an abstract quality and they make to the impression that the building's interiors give, of a former working industrial warehouse/factory.

The aesthetic significance of the building is clear in that it is a distinctive landmark building in the context of the Rocks. Its simple massive form is impressive and is complemented by the industrial warehouse spaces of the interior, which are large, will lit open expanses with expressive timber framing. The surviving equipment provides a unique sculptural quality and contributes to the interpretation and understanding of the former industrial warehouse.

The place has a strong or special association with a particular community or cultural group in New South Wales for social, cultural or spiritual reasons.

The building had landmark status as one of the commercial institutions of the Rocks, and the Company enjoyed community and employee regard as a benevolent employer. Bushells as a Company retains symbolically Australian connotations despite offshore ownership, and the place held by the building, particularly with its prominent signage on the north wall, in the collective imagination of Sydney could be easily underestimated.

Attempts to gain an understanding of the social value (contemporary, community esteem) of the Bushells building would be difficult. However, Bushells has become a symbolically Australian name, arousing a sense of nostalgia in the general community. This may be gained particularly from the prominent signage on the exterior of the building.

The place has potential to yield information that will contribute to an understanding of the cultural or natural history of New South Wales.

The principles capacities of the Bushells Building to inform must lie within the historical and archaeological information that its fabric retains and displays, although there may be some interest in the physical performance of its components parts and structure.

The building is similar to a number of industrial building built at the same time however, many warehouses have been lost to redevelopment in Sydney. The Bushells building provides a rare example of a warehouse that has remained unusually intact in its original ownership and with its original intended use. Its timber construction is a remnant of 19th-century building technique, which was soon to become less common with the introduction of more economical reinforced concrete frame.

The industrial archaeological value is derived from the buildings capacity to illustrate the former function for which it was built and which it served to house for over fifty years. The main elements of industrial archaeological value are found in the modest evidence of former packing line activities seen in the buildings floors and in the extensive evidence of the materials handling methods, as shown in the loading and receiving docks, the horizontal conveyor, the lifts and chutes and especially the two purpose built tea chest elevators (which would be the buildings most significant artefacts).

The surviving archaeological objects; tea chest lifts, chutes and tea mixing hopper provide intriguing and powerful three dimensional artefacts of the past process of tea manufacture.

The place possesses uncommon, rare or endangered aspects of the cultural or natural history of New South Wales.

The Bushells building is a landmark within The Rocks historic area. The building is important for its industrial character and its historical association with the Bushells company. The building is important as it maintained the same use for the same company from 1923 to 1975 and retains many of its industrial manufacturing features.

The building is important in the understanding of the development of local industry in Sydney, it contains rare evidence that all forms of manufacture and food production once occurred with the industrial fringe of Sydney's central business district.

== See also ==
- Australian non-residential architectural styles
- Old Bushells Factory
