= Nerada Tea =

Australian company that produces tea and coffee

- Founded: 1958
- Founder: Allan Maruff
- Headquarters: Nerada, Queensland, Australia
- Products: tea and coffee
- Website: www.neradatea.com.au

Nerada Tea is an Australian company that produces tea and coffee. As of 2019, the company was Australia's largest tea producer.

== History ==
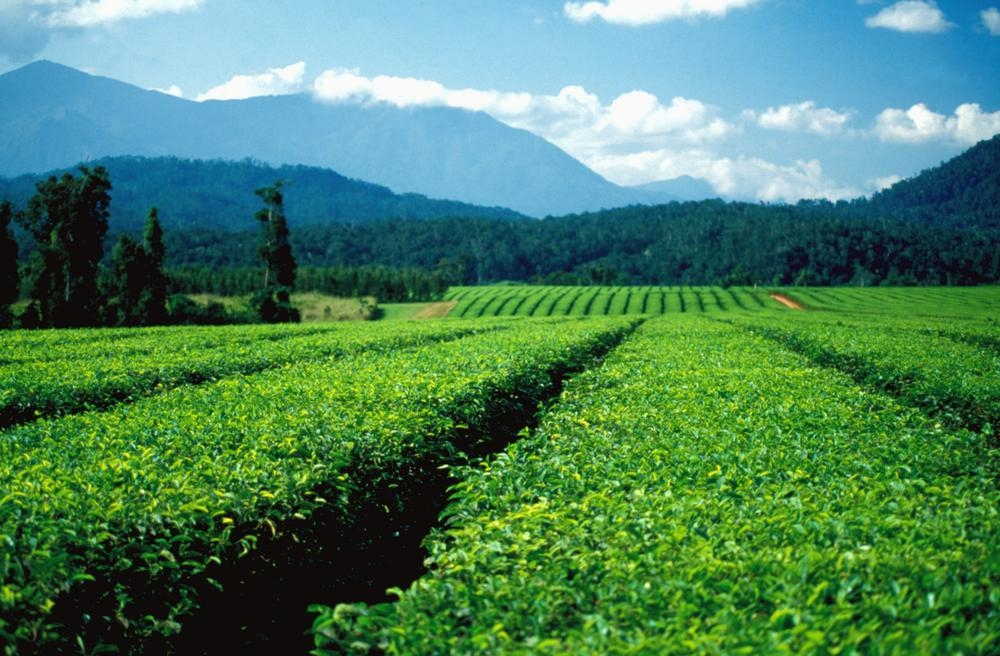
Nerada Tea Plantation at Glen Allyn on the Atherton Tableland, 1986

=== Cutten brothers ===
In 1886, four brothers, James, Leonard, Sidney and Herbert Cutten selected a patch of land on the coast north of Mission Beach at Bingil Bay. They named their new property Bicton and set about the hard, tedious work of turning dense forest into productive land. The brothers had not brought about that transformation entirely by their own labour, but had established good relations with the local Aboriginal people and enlisted their help.

The Cuttens planted tea as well as coffee but could not persuade their local labour force to undertake the constant picking cycle necessary for successful tea production. They had much greater success with their coffee, installing their own coffee mill and marketing the product successfully under their brand name of Bicton Coffee. The Cutten brothers prospered, extending their homestead and improving the property with a sawmill and a wooden railway line from the sawmill to the large stone breakwater that served as their wharf and as shelter for their boats.

They negotiated disasters and setbacks. A cyclone in 1890 caused serious damage and there was drought and subsequent fires in 1902. Acres of coffee trees were destroyed and Herbert Cutten was badly burned. James Cutten eventually sold his share to his brothers and went to live in Cairns where he worked as a draftsman. The brothers lost most of their labour force when the Queensland Government moved to relocate the Aboriginal population onto settlements and limit the numbers that were able to be employed. Then there was another cyclone in 1911.

The outbreak of World War I was the beginning of the end for the Cutten brothers' enterprise. Most of the ships that plied the coast, which the brothers relied on for shipping their produce, were seconded for war service, but the final blow came in the form of the great cyclone of 1918. Two cyclones battered the Queensland coast in that year, the first devastating Rockhampton and Mackay in January. The second cyclone struck in March and was one of the most powerful storms to ever cross Queensland coast. The town of Innisfail was almost totally demolished and to the south, in Bingil Bay and Mission Beach, the winds were accompanied by a massive tidal surge that swept away the huge stone breakwater when it crashed against the cliff below the homestead. Practically the whole estate was destroyed. The brothers, who were by then in their sixties, rebuilt their home, but the orchards and coffee plantations were never restored.

=== Allan Maruff ===
The jungle was left to reclaim the estate until, in the 1950s, a legacy of the Cutten brothers and their Bicton estate was rediscovered by Dr Allan Maruff, a doctor, born in India in 1911 and educated at the University of Calcutta. Maruff had settled in Innisfail and, after years of successful medical practice, he was taken with the idea of growing tea. His wife's family had a home at Darjeeling and she noted the resemblance of the country around Innisfail to that famous tea growing area of India. Some time in the 1950s, Maruff searched for and found the Cutten brothers' estate and, within the rainforest, was the remnant of the unsuccessful tea plantation that had been let to grow wild. The original tea plants had grown into very large trees with an undergrowth of tea plants and seedlings growing from the seed from the large trees. Maruff collected hundreds of seeds and seedlings, which he planted in a nursery behind his surgery.

In 1958, Maruff started the first commercial tea plantings in Australia since 1886 in the Nerada valley, south of Cairns, Queensland, which ultimately became the very successful Nerada Tea. The unexpected legacy of the pioneering Cutten brothers became the basis of a successful tea industry, not only in Queensland but also in Papua New Guinea, after Maruff supplied seed from Nerada to new plantations being established there.

=== Commercialisation ===
In 1969, Tea Estates of Australia (TEA) commenced tea planting adjacent to the Nerada plantation. In 1971, Nerada Tea Estates (NTE) opened Australia's first commercial tea factory. In 1973, TEA purchased NTE, ceased selling bulk tea, and marketed the tea under the Nerada brand. The following year TEA opened a small packing factory in Innisfail. In 1991, TEA opened a larger tea factory in Glen Allyn, near Malanda, and a larger packaging plant the next year in Brisbane.

In 2019, the Nerada Tea plantation and factory were at 933 Glen Allyn Road (17.3835°S 145.6672°E). Nerada Tea was the largest supplier of Australian-grown tea, with over 400 ha (990 acres) of tea planted in the Cairns Region, producing 1,500,000 kg (3,300,000 lb) of black tea.

In May 2023, following a prolonged decline in demand as Australian tastes switched from tea to coffee, Nerada ceased all work at the estate. The plantation was put into "hibernation", and the plantation estate tea rooms, which had once attracted significant international tourism, were closed indefinitely.

== See also ==
- Tea in Australia
- List of oldest companies in Australia
- List of tea companies
