= Bushells =

Australian tea and coffee company

- Founded: 1883; 143 years ago
- Founder: Alfred Bushell
- Headquarters: Australia
- Products: Tea and coffee
- Parent: FreshFood Services (coffee), Lipton Teas and Infusions (tea)
- Website: www.bushells.com.au

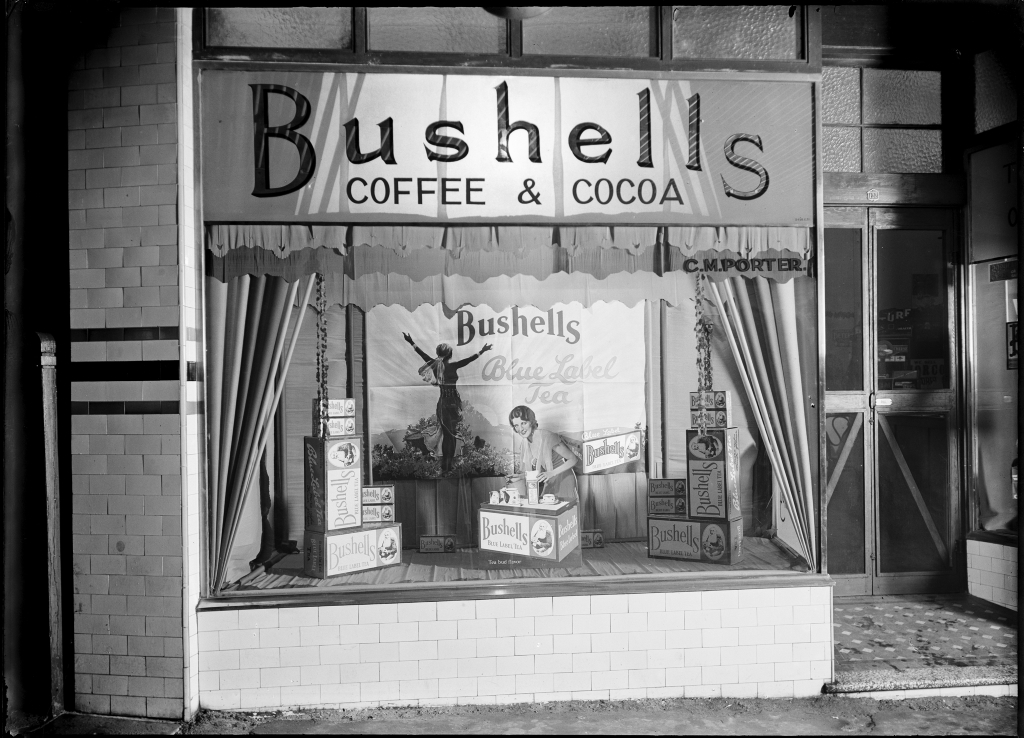
Shopfront: Bushell's Coffee & Cocoa

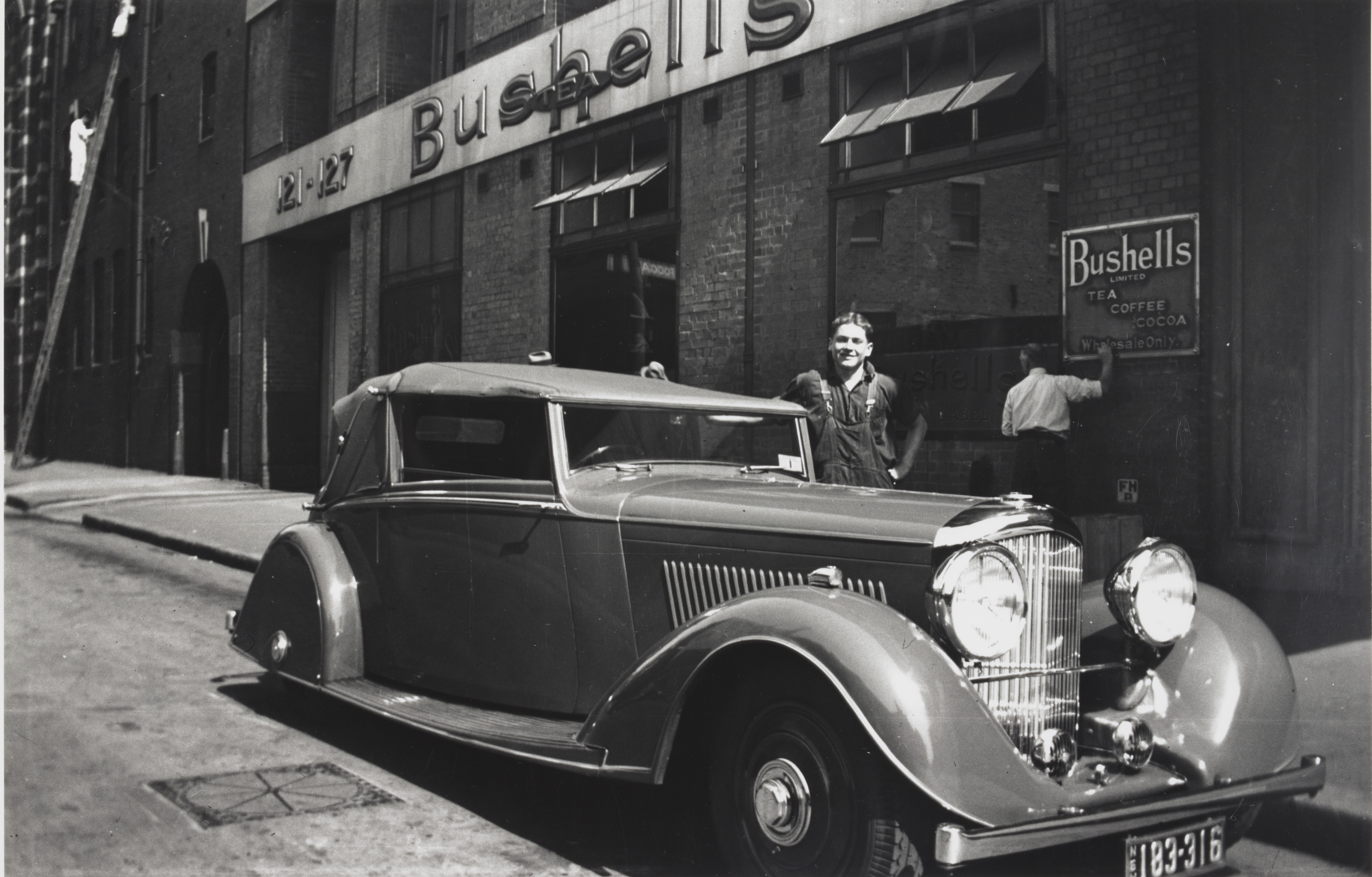
Phillip Bushell's Bently and Factory, Harrington Street, Sydney, 1936 - 1937.

Bushells is an Australian brand that produces tea and coffee. Tea products are owned by Lipton Teas and Infusions, while the coffee business is owned by FreshFood Services.

== History ==
Bushells was founded by Alfred Bushell in 1883, when he opened a tea shop in Queensland. His sons moved the enterprise to Sydney in 1899 and began selling tea commercially, founding Australia's first commercial tea seller. A Bushells tea factory was set up in Harrington Street, Sydney, and a coffee roasting department at Atherton Place in The Rocks.

In 1940, members of the Bushell family acquired the heritage-listed Sydney house, Carthona. In the 1980s, the company diversified its coffee manufacturing under the Bushells Coffee brand.

In 1998, as part of an acquisition of coffee brands from Unilever, FreshFood Services Pty Ltd purchased the Bushells Coffee brand. FreshFood also purchased the New Zealand division of Bushells Coffee. The tea brand remained with Unilever until 2022 when it was divested along with most of Unilever’s tea business to CVC Capital Partners as Lipton Teas and Infusions. Coffee continues to be produced at the Concord factory.

FreshFood announced a long-term plan to close the Concord factory. As of January 2018, planning was still in the early stages and the closure was at least three to five years away.

== See also ==
- Tea in Australia
- List of oldest companies in Australia
- List of tea companies
