= List of tea companies =

This is a list of Wikipedia articles on companies that produce or distribute tea.

== Global ==
- Lipton (Lipton Teas and Infusions; except in India, Nepal and Indonesia where it is owned by Unilever Hindustan)
- Tetley (Tata Global Beverages)
- Twinings (Associated British Foods)

== Australia ==
- Dilmah
- Bushells (Lipton Teas and Infusions)
- Madame Flavour
- Madura Tea Estates
- Nerada Tea
- T2 (Australian company) (Lipton Teas and Infusions)

== Bangladesh ==
- Duncan Brothers (Bangladesh) Limited
- JF (Bangladesh) Limited
- Kazi Farms Group
- M. M. Ispahani Limited
- Orion Group
- Transcom Group

== Brazil ==
- Matte Leão

== Canada ==
- DavidsTea
- Hojicha Co.
- Red Rose Tea (owned by Lipton Teas and Infusions; except in the United States where it is owned by Teekanne)
- Tim Hortons (owned by Restaurant Brands International)

== China ==
- Ten Fu Group (Zhangzhou, Fujian)

== France ==
- Betjeman & Barton
- Fauchon
- Kusmi Tea
- Ladurée
- Le Palais des Thés
- Mariage Frères

== Germany ==
- TeaGschwendner
- Teekanne
- Teekampagne

== Hong Kong ==
- Luk Yu

== India ==
- Godrej Tea
- Gujarat Tea Processors & Packers Ltd (Wagh Bakri brand)
- Limtex
- Brooke Bond Red Label, Taaza, Taj Mahal, and Lipton (owned by Hindustan Unilever)
- Society Tea
- Tata Tea and Tetley (owned by Tata Consumer Products)

== Indonesia ==
- Lipton (Hindustan Unilever)
- Sariwangi
- Sosro

== Ireland ==
- Barry's Tea
- Bewley's
- Lyons Tea (Ireland) (Lipton Teas and Infusions)

== Israel ==
- Wissotzky Tea

== Japan ==
- Harada Tea Processing Co., Ltd.
- Ito En

== Kenya ==
- Kenya Tea Development Agency
- Kericho Gold
- Ketepa

== Malaysia ==
- BOH Tea Plantation
- Sabah Tea

== Nepal ==
- Giribandhu Tea Estate
- Lipton (Hindustan Unilever)
- Rakura tea

== Netherlands ==
- Pickwick (brand) (Douwe Egberts)

== New Zealand ==
- BrewGroup
- Dilmah
- Zealong

== Pakistan ==
- Brooke Bond, Supreme and Red Label (owned by Lipton Teas and Infusions)
- Tapal Tea

== Rwanda ==
- Rwanda Mountain Tea

== Singapore ==
- TWG Tea

== Sri Lanka ==
- Akbar Tea
- Alghazaleen Tea
- Bogawantalawa (BPL Teas)
- Dilmah
- Heladiv
- George Steuart Group (Steuarts Tea, 1835 Steuart Ceylon)
- Mlesna

== Turkey ==
- Çaykur

== United Kingdom ==
The UK market is dominated by five brands - PG Tips (owned by Lipton Teas and Infusions), Tetley (owned by Tata Tea Limited), Typhoo (owned by the Indian conglomerate Apeejay Surrendra Group), Twinings (owned by Associated British Foods) and Yorkshire Tea (owned by Bettys and Taylors of Harrogate). Tetley leads the market with 27% share, followed by PG Tips with about 24% share. Typhoo is in third place with about 13% share. Twinings is fourth with about 11% share and Yorkshire Tea is fifth with about 6% share.

- Ahmad Tea
- Associated British Foods
- Bettys and Taylors of Harrogate
- Brooke Bond (no longer trading under this name: see PG Tips) (Lipton Teas and Infusions)
- Clipper tea
- Fortnum & Mason
- Glengettie tea
- Horniman's Tea
- Jacksons of Piccadilly
- Lancashire Tea
- Lyons Tea (Lipton Teas and Infusions)
- Matthew Algie
- Mazawattee Tea Company
- Nambarrie (Twinings)
- PG Tips (Lipton Teas and Infusions)
- Punjana
- Scottish Blend (Lipton Teas and Infusions)
- Taylors of Harrogate (Bettys and Taylors Group)
- Typhoo
- Whittard of Chelsea
- Yorkshire Tea: a brand of Taylors Tea (Bettys and Taylors PunjanaGroup)

== United States ==
- American Tea Room
- Argo Tea
- Bigelow Tea Company
- Capital Teas
- Celestial Seasonings (owned by Hain Celestial Group)
- Good Earth Tea
- Harney & Sons
- Honest Tea
- Imperial Tea Court
- Luzianne
- Mighty Leaf Tea
- Numi Organic Tea
- Peet's Coffee & Tea
- Red Diamond
- Salada tea (Lipton Teas and Infusions)
- Stash Tea
- Talbott Teas (owned by Jamba Juice)
- Tavalon Tea
- Tazo (Lipton Teas and Infusions)
- Té Company
- Tea Forté
- TeaGschwendner
- Teavana (owned by Starbucks)
- The Republic of Tea
- Upton Tea
- Yogi Tea

=== Bottled tea ===
- Argo Tea
- AriZona Beverage Company
- Honest Tea
- Ito En
- Lipton (Pepsi-Lipton, a joint venture between PepsiCo and Unilever)
- Milo's Tea Company
- Nestea
- Snapple
- SoBe
- Sweet Leaf Tea
- Tazo
- Turkey Hill
- T2 (tea products company) (Pepsi-Lipton, a joint venture between PepsiCo and Unilever)

== See also ==
- Tea
