= Tea in New Zealand =

Tea drinking has been part of New Zealand culture since European settlement. Some tea is produced in New Zealand, such as from BrewGroup and Zealong. The country once drank more tea per capita than Britain. Tea consumption has been declining, and the country has been drinking more coffee than tea since about the 1980s.

== History ==
Tea Examination Act 1882

Black tea was brought to New Zealand by European settlers. Captain Cook and early New Zealand settlers used mānuka (Leptospermum scoparium) as a substitute for tea, and would refer to it as "tea tree". Early settlers also used the leaves of the kawakawa tree (Piper excelsum) for tea. In 1882 the Tea Examination Act created a testing regime that was set up to make sure that tea was pure, meaning that it did not contain sawdust or other foreign substances. By the early 20th century, almost all tea was imported from the colonies of the British Empire, mainly India and Sri Lanka, as opposed to China, a large tea producer.

Several tea gardens popped up from the 1850s to the 1880s, which allowed for outdoor socialisation and entertainment. Some of these include Wilkinson's Tea Gardens in Wellington and Waiata Tropical Gardens in Auckland. Tea rooms were also popular throughout the 20th century, mainly for the socialisation of women, although men were allowed in them. New Zealand Geographic has described these as an "iconic part of New Zealand culture". In the early 20th century, Harry Ell envisioned having walkways with tea houses and rest houses spaced regularly apart in the Port Hills of Christchurch. He planned on making 14 of these, but only 4 were built: the Sign of the Bellbird, the Sign of the Packhorse, the Sign of the Kiwi and the Sign of the Takahe.

New Zealand once drank more tea per capita than the UK. Consumption of black tea declined from an annual 3 to 3.5 kg (6.6 to 7.7 lb) per person in 1910, to 0.6 kg (1.3 lb) in the early-1960s. The consumption of coffee has been increasing since the 1940s, encouraged by European refugees, American servicemen being stationed in New Zealand, the introduction of instant coffee in the 1960s, and the rise of café culture. Since the 1980s, New Zealanders have been drinking more coffee than tea. The morning tea and afternoon tea breaks were created for tea consumption and the evening meal dinner can be referred to as tea. Tea is consumed in New Zealand by people of all social classes. Teabags were introduced to New Zealand in 1969.

== Producers ==
Bell Tea was founded in Dunedin in 1898 and acquired Amber Tips tea in 1963 and Edgelets as well as Tiger Tea in 1969. The company has a 40% market share in New Zealand (as at 2013). After taking over many coffee brands and starting to sell more coffee than tea, the company was renamed to BrewGroup in 2016. Zealong was New Zealand's first commercial tea plantation. It has a plantation in the Waikato.
