= The Nice Ones =

American progressive rock band

Background information
- Origin: Northwestern Connecticut, United States
- Genres: Rock, progressive rock
- Years active: 2011-present
- Members: Tyler Beaujon; Patrick Surdham (Pastor Dan); Dillon Morrison Halas; Sam McGarrity

The Nice Ones are an American progressive rock band.

== History ==
The Nice Ones formed in Northwestern Connecticut in 2011, merging two songwriting partnerships: vocalist/guitarist Patrick Surdam and drummer Tyler Beaujon, both of North Canaan, Connecticut, and guitarist/vocalist/keyboardist Sam McGarrity and bassist Dillon Morrison Halas, of Lakeville, Connecticut and Kent, Connecticut respectively. The band performed solely as a live act for over a year, locally in Connecticut and New York as well as in a tour to Austin, Texas during South by Southwest music festival in 2012.

=== To Be Frank (2012-2013) ===
In late 2012, the band ran a Kickstarter campaign to record their earliest material. Following the success of that campaign, The Nice Ones released their first album, To Be Frank, in 2013. The album was recorded by producer Paul Orofino at Millbrook Sound Studios in Millbrook, New York. The Nice Ones toured heavily in New York City, specifically Manhattan and Brooklyn, before another studio effort.

=== Hungry Ghosts EP (2014-2015) ===
In 2014, the band recorded five songs at Stone Studio in Lakeville, Connecticut with producer Graham Stone. The sessions resulted in Hungry Ghosts EP, released in 2015. The supporting Hungry Ghosts EP tour brought The Nice Ones to northeastern cities Boston, Massachusetts and Philadelphia, Pennsylvania for the first time, as well as regional universities.

The EP's song "Big Sexi" was released as a single in October 2015, followed by the band's first official music video, directed by Al Harney.

== Musicianship ==
The Nice Ones are categorized as rock and progressive rock. All four members contribute vocally in performances and structurally in the songwriting process, though all lyrics are written by primary-vocalist Patrick Surdam.

== Discography ==
=== Albums ===
- To Be Frank (self-released, 2013)

=== EPs ===
- Hungry Ghosts EP (self-released, 2015)
