= Madame Flavour =

Australian tea company

- Product type: Tea
- Current owner: Corinne Noyes
- Country: Australia
- Introduced: 2007; 19 years ago
- Markets: Worldwide
- Website: www.madameflavour.com

Madame Flavour is a tea and tisane company based in Australia. It was established by Corinne Noyes in 2007 after she found a market gap for high-quality loose leaf tea.

Teas for the different blends are sourced from Sri Lanka, India and China, and combined with locally grown native Australian herbs. The blends are inspired by Noyes' travels to Cuba, France, America, China, Sri Lanka and Norway.

Noyes continues her role in the company as Head Tea Blender.

== Packaging ==
The brand is female-focused, and boxes of tea bags also include letters or colouring-in sheets which have built rapport between Noyes and her customers. When the tea blends were first launched in supermarkets, Noyes hand-signed 1000 of the enclosed letters. The letters have garnered 20,000 letters replying to the company. The teas are available in loose leaf or contained within gauze pyramid-shaped teabags, or infuser pods. The teabags are made from a corn starch derivative, and are green plant certified and biodegradable.

== Blends ==
In 2011, the teas included Signature Blend, Grey De Luxe, Sultry Chai, Green, Jasmine and Pear and White with Rose. That same year, Mint Lavender Tisane was added to the range. The caffeine-free blend combines peppermint, spearmint, lavender and peppermint gum leaves. It was inspired by Noyes' rainforest property in South Gippsland.

In 2012, the brand changed to a smaller, cheaper 18 pack with new tea versions Special Blend 18 and Grey de Luxe 18.

In 2015, the tea range was expanded with "Tea Treats", which was billed as the first dessert-inspired tea range in Australian supermarkets. The single-origin blends included Orange Choc Ceylon, Caramel Oolong and Mint Choc Rooibos.

In Winter 2016, Madame Flavour launched new tea blends, Blood Orange Fruit Tea, Ginger Masala Chai and Green Jasmine Pear.

=== Ingredients ===
The Earl Grey Twist blend contains lemon myrtle from a farm in Lismore, the Sultry Chai blend is made with Australian mountain pepper leaf from South Gippsland, English Breakfast has organic Assam loose leaves from Sri Lanka, and Mint Lavender blend has lavender from France, and round leaf mint from Gippsland.

== Distribution and structure ==
In February 2008, Noyes presented to a major supermarket chain, and by July that year, the range was being sold in 700 supermarkets.

In 2012, the tea blends were sold in over 1200 supermarkets, and in 2015, this increased to over 1800 supermarkets including major chains Coles, Woolworths and New Zealand's Countdown. Madame Flavour teas are served on Virgin Australia flights and in Crown and Metropole hotels. The company produces 15 million bags of tea in up to 60 different varieties each year. As of 2016, Madame Flavour was close to achieving sales of $5 million AUD. In 2017, the teas were available in supermarkets across New Zealand, Malaysia, Singapore and Hong Kong.

In May 2020, Noyes asked customers via an Instagram post, to support the company while they await the outcome of the administration of Virgin Australia. Madame Flavour was a creditor as they supplied tea to Virgin lounges nationally. The high volume of customer support caused the Madame Flavour website to crash from the amount of traffic.

=== Location ===
The business was originally founded from Noyes' home in Highett in 2007.

In 2011, Noyes and husband Matt and daughter Sienna moved to Gippsland, with the business relocating to a commercial building elsewhere in Highett. The business now operates from Brighton.

== Marketing, awards and campaigns ==
In 2011, Noyes was a Victorian finalist in the Telstra Business Women's awards.

In 2012, the infuser pods were a finalist in the Beverages category of the Food Magazine Awards.

A "Let beautiful happen" branding campaign by Nourish Brands was a finalist in the 2013 Melbourne Design Awards in the Advertising-Print category.

In 2014, Madame Flavour supported the Fish Creek Tea Cosy Festival.

Noyes spoke on 'conscious marketing' and product values, at the ADMA (Association for Data-Driven Marketing & Advertising) Global Forum in August 2015.

In 2016, the brand worked with Smiling Mind to create a three-minute tea-infusion meditation ritual. The app-based ritual is focused on fostering mindfulness.

== See also ==
- Tea in Australia
- List of oldest companies in Australia
- List of tea companies
