= Ten Ren Tea =

Taiwan-based tea company

Ten Ren Tea Co., Ltd.
- Type: Public
- Traded as: TWSE: 1233
- Industry: Food manufacturing
- Founded: 1953; 73 years ago
- Headquarters: Taipei, Taiwan
- Products: Tea, ginseng
- Net income: NT$ 139,266,000
- Subsidiaries: Ten Fu Group
- Website: www.tenren.com.tw

Ten Ren's Tea or Tian Ren's Tea (Chinese: 天仁茶業; pinyin: Tiān Rén Cháyè) is a Taiwanese company that specializes in tea and ginseng products.

== History ==
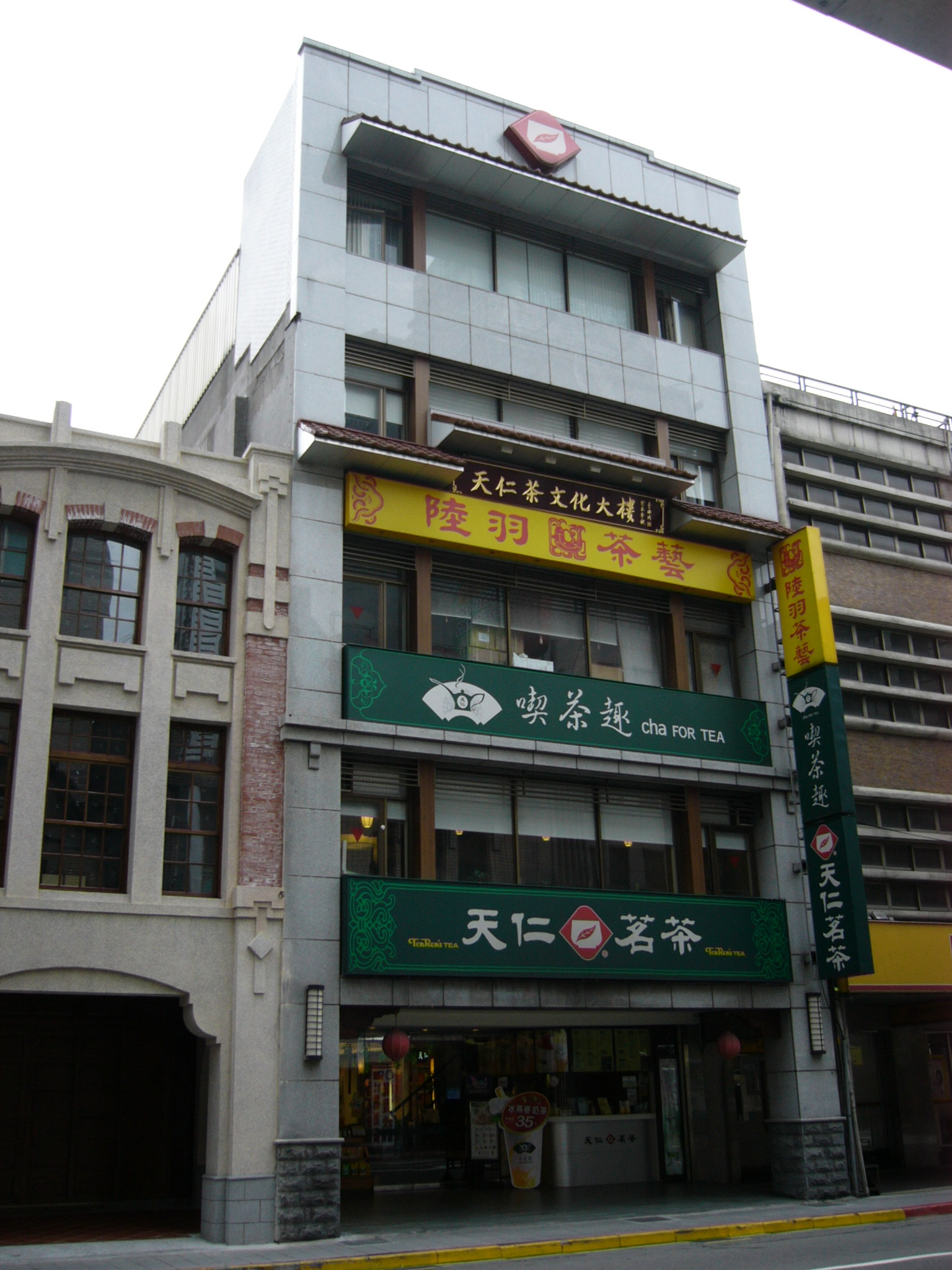
Ten Ren's Tea Culture Building (天仁茶文化大樓) in Taipei

Founded in 1953 in Taiwan by Ray Ho Lee, Ten Ren's Group (天仁集團) also operates Cha for Tea teahouses in Southern California as well as Ten Ren's Tea (天仁茗茶) stores in California and six Ten Rens in New York, and other places, and through the subsidiary Ten Fu Group (天福集團) produces and sells tea products in China, where much of its activity now takes place.

By 2003 it had 113 outlets globally, making it Taiwan's largest tea shop chain.

== Global operations ==
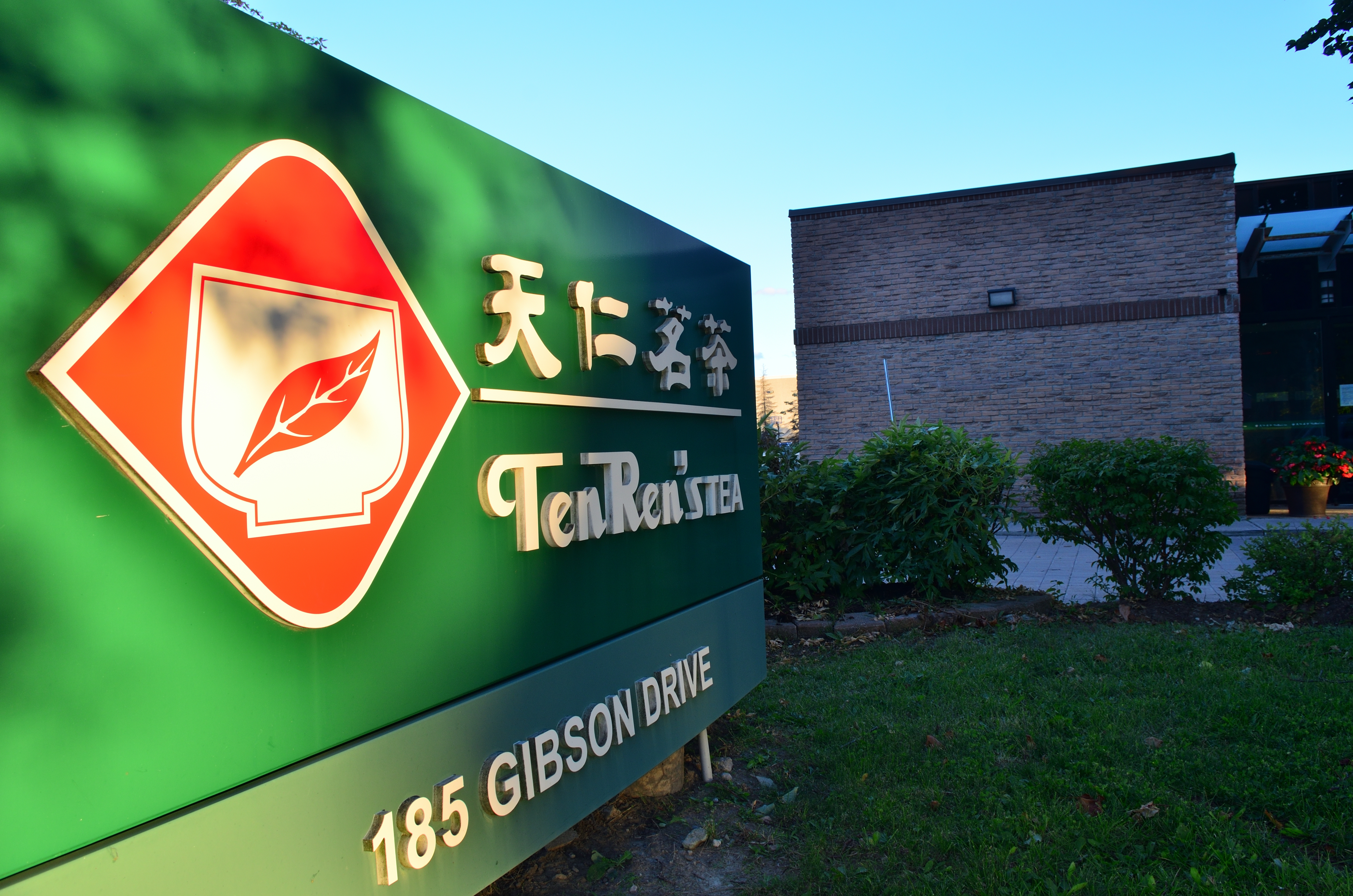
Ten Ren Tea office in Ontario, Canada

Ten Ren Tea is located in Australia, Japan, Canada, Malaysia, the United States and other countries. The Ten Ren Tea and the Lu-Yu Tea Institute are part of the Ten Fu Group. The Lu-Yu Tea Culture Institute (陸羽茶藝中心) was founded in 1980. Ten Fu Group in 1993, as a way of bringing Taiwanese tea expertise back to mainland China. Ten Fu had over 1,000 retail stores across China "as of 2010". Tenfu Tea College (天福茶學院) was founded in 2007 by Ten Fu Group.

Ten Ren's Tea Vancouver store was featured as a challenge location in an episode of The Amazing Race Canada. The episode was watched by 2.9 million Canadians.

== See also ==
- Taiwanese tea
- List of companies of Taiwan
