= American Tea Room =

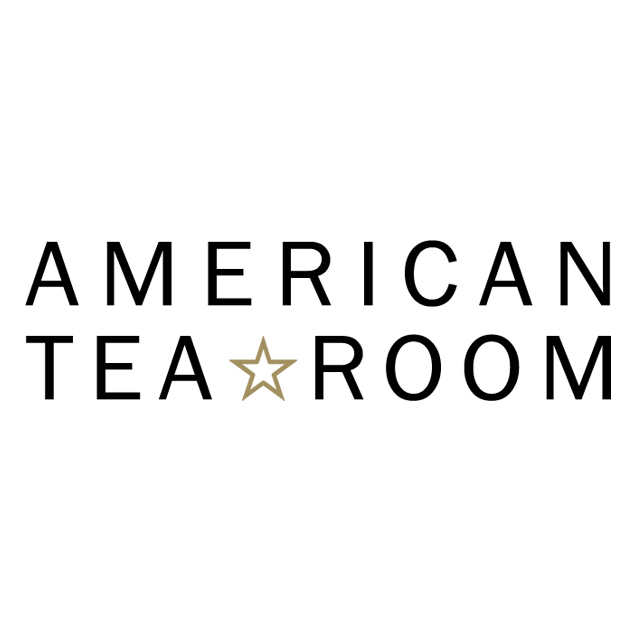
- Industry: Retail Tea; Web store Cafe
- Founded: 2003
- Defunct: 2018
- Headquarters: Beverly Hills, California, United States
- Number of locations: Two
- Products: Loose-leaf tea Made-to-order tea beverages Tea-related products
- Website: AmericanTeaRoom.com

American Tea Room was a specialty tea and tea accessory retailer, web store, and cafe based in Beverly Hills, California. On March 8, 2018, it was announced that American Tea Room would cease all operations. American Tea Room was also mentioned in the end credits of Outer Wilds.

== Products ==
=== Teas ===
American Tea Room used a seasonal, rotating selection of over 200 teas from around the world. These teas included rare single estate teas, tea blends, herbal teas, matcha, blooming teas, Earl Grey and English Breakfast blends and more in every tea category, with a majority USDA Organic.

=== Tea products ===
In addition to their tea, American Tea Room carried a host of porcelain, glass, and cast iron teapots, tea cups, and tea accessories for scooping, steeping, and storing tea. They also carry a range of matcha related bowls, whisks, and scoops.

== Locations ==
American Tea Room was previously located in Beverly Hills, Downtown Los Angeles, and in Newport Beach.
