= Ali Mandhry =

Kenyan TV celebrity chef

- Born: 13 May 1988 (age 38); Mombasa, Kenya
- Other names: Chef Ali, Ali L’artiste
- Education: Kenya Utalii College
- Occupations: Chef, artist and media personality
- Website: www.instagram.com/chefalimandhry

Ali Said Alamin Mandhry, also known as Chef Ali L’artiste, is a TV celebrity chef in Kenya.

== Early life and education ==
According to Mandhry, inspiration from his grandfather got him into the kitchen at age nine, and started selling cakes he baked to fellow students and teachers at age twelve.

After high school, Mandhry worked as an intern at the Sarova White Sands Beach Resort and Spa. He later enrolled in a food production apprenticeship course at Kenya Utalii College.

== Career ==
In January 2011, Mandhry became a culinary instructor at Kenya Utalii College's Mombasa campus, in charge of the food production department.

Mandhry currently hosts a cooking show dubbed Food Time that broadcasts on Pwani TV and Celebrity Kitchen Raid on Zuku Entertainment Channel 100 that broadcasts Internationally. previously he hosted a cooking show on NTV Kenya, Tamu Tamu: Kenyan Cuisine with a Twist and also Pilipili Jikoni, a Swahili radio program on Pilipili Fm in Mombasa.

Mandhry also co hosts Power Breakfast every Thursday on Citizen TV Kenya.

Mandhry is an author and writes the ‘Eats’ recipe column every Saturday on eve woman magazine, it is published on standard newspaper

Mandhry is a judge on the first Kenya's reality cooking competition, Kikwetu Supa Chef, which airs on K24. Mandhry owns the L’artiste Pastry Factory and is a representative of the Kenya's Chef Association. Mandhry was appointed the brand ambassador for Kericho Gold Tea. He has been named among the top 5 reigning chefs of African cuisine by Africa Style Daily. He has also been considered among top male chefs in Africa by DSTV.

== Publications and media ==
Mandhry has appeared in newspapers, magazines, radio and television. In December 2011 Mandhry appeared alongside Osama el Sayed on Ma Osama Atyab to promote authentic Kenyan cuisine.

== Honors and awards ==
- International Hall of Fame Award, The Sweet Life
- Sheikh Khalifa bin Zayed al Nahyan Sports Award, Tamu Tamu, NTV Arabic edition
