= Capital Teas =

American specialty tea brand

- Industry: Tea; Tea Products
- Founded: 2007 in Annapolis, Maryland, United States
- Headquarters: Annapolis, Maryland, United States
- Area served: Worldwide
- Products: Tea; Teapots; Tea Infusers
- Website: capitalteas.com

Capital Teas is an American specialty tea brand, founded in 2007 in Annapolis, Maryland, that offers premium loose tea and tea-related products. From 2007 through 2018, the company operated brick and mortar stores, peaking at 24 retails stores in eight states by late 2016. Two years later, the company shifted strategies. In October 2018, Anchor Beverages, Inc. took over the Capital Teas brand to operate exclusively in online and wholesale channels. In October 2024, the company entered into a sale transaction that relocated its operations to Fredericksburg, Virginia. In July 2025, the brand was sold to Nostos Brands, LLC, and relocated back to Annapolis, Maryland.

== History ==
Capital Teas was founded in 2007 by Peter and Manelle Martino. Manelle’s family has been involved in the tea industry for 5 generations starting with her great great grandfather Francis van Reyk. He planted one of the original tea estates in Sri Lanka in the late 1800’s. 

The company expanded its footprint to 24 locations across the US with Peter Martino as the CEO and management team who mostly came from Teavana. Their rapid expansion into malls strategy proved unsuccessful due to a decline in mall foot traffic and high leases. The company was forced to shutter all locations but maintained its eCommerce presence. The Capital Teas brand struggled under previous management and was sold in July 2025 to Manelle Martino. The Capital Teas brand is now owned and operated by her new company, Nostos Brands, LLC in Annapolis, MD.

Capital Teas has been recognized as an innovator in the tea industry with products such as their tea and alcohol infusions including Tea Lager Beer Enhancers and Vino Teano Wine Mixers.

== Products ==
The signature teas of the Capital Teas brand include Capital Breakfast, Annapolis Treasures, Chesapeake Sunrise, Turmeric Ginger, Island Mango, and Roasted Almond. The majority of the teas sold under the Capital Teas brand are USDA-certified organic, and nearly all its teas contain only natural ingredients.
