= Hojicha Co. =

Japanese tea company

HOJICHA TRADING CO. LTD. LA MAISON HOJICHA CO. LTÉE
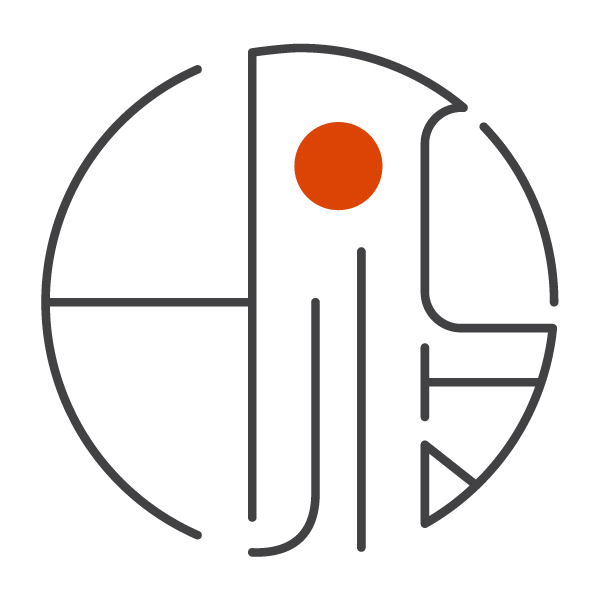
- HOJICHA Hanko Design
- Trade name: Hojicha Co. La Maison Hojicha Co.
- Type: Privately held company
- Industry: Food, beverage, tea
- Founded: 2018; 8 years ago in Toronto, Canada
- Headquarters: Ontario, Canada
- Area served: North America; Europe; Australia; Singapore
- Products: Hojicha, matcha, teaware, Japanese tea utensils
- Website: hojicha.co

Hojicha Co. is brand of Japanese tea launched in 2018 specializing in Japanese roasted green tea (hōjicha) produced in Kyoto, Japan. Best known for popularizing the use of ground hojicha powder in cafés, the brand primarily distributes its products in North America, Europe, and Australia.

== History ==
Established as a Canadian business corporation in Ontario, Hojicha Co. released a first collection of Japanese roasted green teas in 2018. Shortly after the brand launched, Food Navigator named Hojicha Co. one of the most popular food startup stories of 2018. Since its inception, the primary business model of the brand has been direct-to-consumer (DTC) e-commerce sales.

In April 2019, Hojicha Co. announced its plans to introduce hojicha powder in North American tea shops and cafés to further accelerate the hojicha trend outside of Japan, leveraging the existing popularity of matcha powder among consumers in the West.

Hojicha Co. was awarded "Best Tea 2019" at the Toronto Coffee & Tea Expo in May 2019, and its "Hojicha Gold Roast" tea won the third position in green tea in blind tasting at the 2020 Toronto Tea Festival.

In November 2023, Hojicha Co. announced a collaboration with Marukyu Koyamaen Co., Ltd. and became an official distributor of their matcha in markets outside of Japan.

== Products ==
Hojicha Co. offers a wide range of Japanese roasted green tea leaves and the "original" hojicha powder, the principal ingredient used in the preparation of the hojicha latte recipe. The company also offers Uji matcha through a distribution partnership with the brand Marukyu Koyamaen, and a variety of tea accessories made in Japan.

== See also ==
- Hōjicha (Japanese roasted green tea)
- List of tea companies
