= DavidsTea =

Canadian specialty tea retailer

DAVIDsTEA

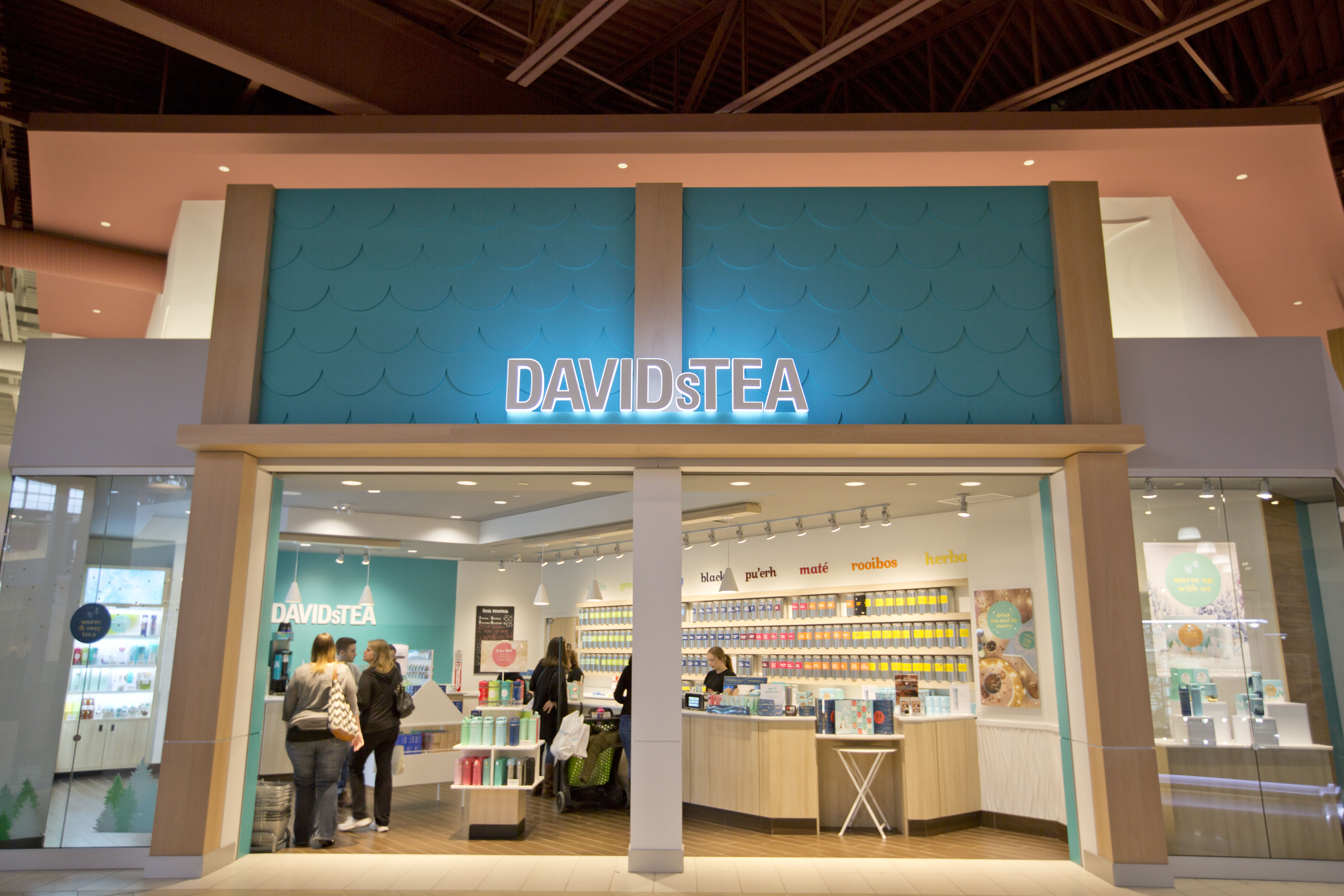
- The storefront of a former DavidsTea location in the Tsawwassen Mills shopping mall
- Type: Public
- Traded as: TSX-V: DTEA
- Founded: Montreal, Quebec, Canada (2008)
- Founders: David Segal; Herschel Segal
- Headquarters: Mount Royal, Quebec, Canada
- Number of locations: 23
- Area served: Canada, US (formerly)
- Key people: Jane Silverstone Segal (executive chairman); Frank Zitella (COO/CFO); Sarah Segal (CEO/CBO)
- Products: Loose-leaf tea, tea bags, teaware
- Revenue: 41.2 million (2019)
- Website: davidstea.com

DavidsTea (often stylized as DAVIDsTEA) (in French Les Thés DavidsTea) is a publicly traded Canadian specialty tea and tea accessory retailer based in Montreal, Quebec. It is the largest Canadian-based specialty tea boutique in the country.

The company had 240 locations but by July 2020 required financial reorganization, which involved permanently closing all 42 U.S. stores, 166 stores in Canada, and focusing on its e-commerce and wholesale business.

== History ==
In 2008, David Segal and his cousin Herschel Segal founded DavidsTea's headquarters and main offices in Montreal, but opened its first store on Queen Street in Toronto the same year, followed by its first Montreal store, in 2009. In 2010, the company had stores located across Canada, opening its 50th store in Waterloo, Ontario in 2011 and, that November, opened its first store outside of Canada, in New York City. A growing boutique tea industry expanded the company, by 2012, to more than 75 stores across North America, with over 150 varieties of tea.

In 2013, former talkshow host Oprah Winfrey surprised the small company by promoting the brand in live shows, and later in O, The Oprah Magazine.

=== IPO and Board Struggle ===
The company conducted an initial public offering in the United States on June 5 2015, trading on the NASDAQ under stock ticker DTEA. The company reported a $93.2 million net loss in the first quarter of 2015, holding responsible the costs of being publicly traded, weakening Canadian Dollar and higher supply chain costs. In September 2015, the company reported another quarterly loss of $52.2 million. In February 2016, the company reported that it had opened 39 stores over the previous financial year.

In March 2016, the company reported in a filing to the United States Securities and Exchange Commission (SEC) that co-founder David Segal had resigned as the brand ambassador of the company. In April 2016, the company received letters from the attorneys general of nine American states, including Eric Schneiderman of New York, asking for information about requiring employees to call before a shift to find out if they are required to work.

In October 2016, CEO Sylvain Toutant announced that he would be quitting in January. On December 8, 2016, Christine Bullen, the managing director for U.S. markets, was named interim president and CEO, effective February 1, 2017.

On March 13, 2017, DavidsTea appointed Joel Silver as president and chief executive officer. In June 2017, the company announced that CFO Luis Borgen would depart after five years at the company. In September 2017, the company reported that it had lost $5.6 million in Q3 despite the struggles of competitor Teavana. The company's struggling expansion into the United States was criticised by former chairman Pierre Michaud who said that the constant changes in strategy had led to the departures of senior executives and a loss in investments. Joel Silver reported that the company hadn't understood the preference of U.S. consumers for iced tea over hot brews and their sweeter palate compared to Canadian consumers. He announced that the company reduce its offerings from 130 varieties to focus on best sellers and slow its American expansion.

On June 14, 2018, Silver resigned as chief executive after the company's shareholders voted to elect a new group of directors backed by founder Herschel Segal to the board. Shareholder TDM Asset Management criticised Herschel Segal's "erratic" behaviour, his inability to lead employees and his track record with struggling clothing retailer Le Château and reduced its stake from 12.2-per-cent stake to 1.6-per-cent for US$9.38-billion.

In August 2018, DavidsTea announced plans to sell tea bags of their best-selling blends at Loblaw locations across Canada.

=== Bankruptcy ===
In June 2020, DavidsTea announced that it has not paid rent at any of its store locations for three months as all its stores had been closed since March 17 due to the COVID-19 pandemic. It also indicated that it may pursue a formal restructuring. The company announced on July 8 that it was filing for bankruptcy protection from its creditors in Canada to continue operations while it restructured, and planned to close down a significant number of stores. By that date, the company had obtained Chapter 15, Title 11, United States Code court protection from creditors in the US. The next day, it was announced that 82 locations in Canada and all 42 locations in the United States would close, while more favourable leases were sought for the remaining 100 stores, with more to potentially close depending on the outcome of these talks with landlords. By September, they had reduced the number of retail locations to 18. Of 240 locations it had at the start of 2020, it permanently closed all 42 U.S. stores and 166 stores in Canada. It announced that it would focus on its e-commerce and wholesale businesses.

In April 2023, DavidsTea voluntarily delisted its common shares from the Nasdaq Global Market and began trading under the TSX Venture Exchange in Canada.

In January 2024, CEO Sarah Segal said that she was focusing on turning around the business instead of entertaining offers for sale.

On May 10, 2025 the company reported that founder Herschel Segal had died five days previous. The announcement also reported that Rainy Day Investments, Segal's investment company and the largest shareholder of DavidsTea would remain committed to the company.

In August 2025, New York-based lawyer Philip Segal, Herschel's son from his first marriage, called for a change of management at the company in a blogpost, describing an "epic" value destruction and “abysmal corporate governance and management" by his half-sister Sarah Segal (CEO since 2020) and Segal's widow Jane Silverstone Segal, who had been Chair of the company since 2021.

In September 2025, the company reported $1.6 million loss in its second quarter due to declining online sales.
