= Tea Forté =

American tea company based in Maynard, Massachusetts

Tea Forté Inc
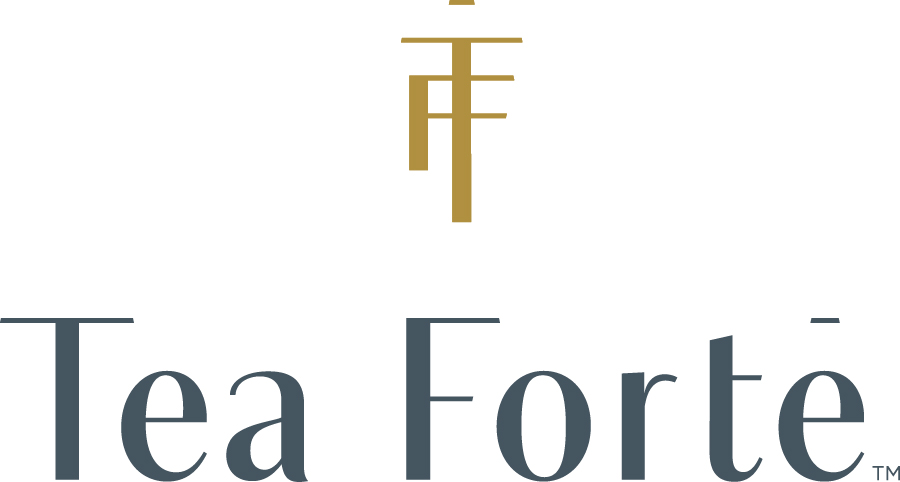
- Company type: Private
- Industry: Beverage
- Founded: Concord, Massachusetts (2003)
- Headquarters: Maynard, Massachusetts, United States
- Products: Tea, Herbal teas, Jardin, Fleur, Wellbeing, Tea-Over-Ice
- Website: www.teaforte.com

Tea Forté Inc. is an American tea company based in Maynard, Massachusetts. The company was founded in 2003 by Peter Hewitt, an American product designer and graduate from the Rhode Island School of Design. The company produces a highly stylized product line inspired by the Japanese tea ceremony, intended to "elevate a cup of tea into an extraordinary experience for all of your senses".

== Products ==
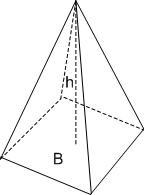
Tea Forté uses an elongated pyramidal teabag design

The basis of the product line is blended high-quality tea and herbal teas of which, in January 2013, there are 79 varieties including black, green, white, herbals, and oolong. Available as individual servings, the tea is sold in elongated pyramidal tea bags, or infusers, made and packaged in China out of recycled plastic. The tall, square pyramid design of the infuser is trademarked, following the tradition of a tetrahedral Japanese design which permits loose tea to swell as it steeps. These three-dimensional designs allow higher-quality "whole leaf" teas to be used than previously possible with traditional flat tea bags.

Tea Forté products are marketed as luxury items and sold at high-end retailers, gift shops, restaurants, spas and hotels worldwide. As explained by the Boston Business Journal, "Hewitt makes no excuses for the high-end bag he calls more of an 'idea' than a product." In 2007, the price ranged from US$1.00 to US$2.50 per bag, depending on packaging and the quantity purchased. The tea is also sold loose in canisters. Accessories are designed to complement the unique infusers, and include infuser-sized "tea trays," glass and ceramic teacups and teapots, a wooden presentation case, and serving trays.

A product endorsement by Oprah Winfrey, was featured in the October 2004 edition of O, The Oprah Magazine. A second endorsement for Tea Forté's KATI Tea Brewing System was chosen as one of Oprah's Favorite Things in the 2011 edition of O, The Oprah Magazine as picked by Mehmet Oz.

In 2011, Tea Forté won the gold sofi award NASFT "Outstanding Food Gift" for Teas for the Heart. A heart shaped box filled with green teas to help raise awareness to champion WomenHeart, the national coalition for women with heart disease.

Tea Forté's Blueberry Merlot, from the Herbal Retreat Collection won the award for best "Flavored Herbal Blends" in 2011 from the North American Tea Championship. Tea Forté's Lemon Sorbetti, won a Silver Finalist SOFI Award for "Best Hot Beverage" in 2012.
