= Numi Organic Tea =

American tea company

- Type: Private
- Industry: Beverage
- Founded: 1999; 27 years ago
- Headquarters: Oakland, California
- Products: Tea
- Website: www.numitea.com

Numi Organic Tea is a privately owned triple bottom line social enterprise based in Oakland, California. Numi is known for its assortment of organic and fair trade certified teas and herbal "teasans". The company was founded in 1999 by brother and sister, Ahmed Rahim and Reem Hassani. The founders named the company "Numi" after the citrusy, Middle Eastern dried lime tea they drank as children growing up in Iraq. The name Numi is derived from the Arabic word for citrus. The J.M. Smucker Company holds a minority stake in Numi.

== Certifications ==
All of Numi's teas are USDA certified Organic and many are certified Fair Trade. In 2010, Numi was recognized as the largest brand purchaser of Fair Trade Certified teas in the U.S.

Numi blends organic and fair trade certified tea leaves and herbs exclusively with real ingredients leaving out the use of artificial flavorings, "natural" flavorings, and/or fragrances commonly used in food & beverage products.

== Products ==
Numi sells bagged tea, loose leaf tea, iced tea, gift items and other tea-related products. The company offers tea types including green, black, white, oolong, pu-erh, and herbal teas such as honeybush and rooibos. Numi was first to introduce a full line of pu-erh tea products to the U.S. market. In 2012, Numi added five new pu-erh flavors to its existing bagged pu-erh tea line.

The company is also known for introducing a full line of flowering tea and Bamboo Flowering Tea Gift Set in 2005. Flowering teas are made from organic tea leaves that have been hand sewn around flowers to create small, round bundles that blossom when steeped in hot water.

== Practices ==
Numi Organic Tea is a prominent social enterprise in the U.S. and a founding B Corporation. The company manufactures and distributes its tea in biodegradable, filter-paper tea bags rather than silk tea bags often made from petroleum based materials. Numi's tea bags are packaged in recyclable boxes made of 85% post-consumer waste, printed with soy-based inks and not wrapped with plastic. In 2020, Numi introduced commercially compostable, plant-based tea wrappers. The wrappers are made from a sugarcane Non-GMO PLA layer, metalized eucalyptus layer, FSC certified paper, and have been tested to produce no eco-toxicity when they break down. Numi is a Climate Neutral certified brand, meaning it has committed to measure, offset and reduce its annual carbon emissions.
