= Zealong =

New Zealand tea company

- Product type: Tea
- Current owner: Zealong
- Country: New Zealand
- Introduced: 1996
- Website: www.zealong.com

Zealong is a New Zealand tea company based in Hamilton, New Zealand. Zealong was the first commercial tea plantation in New Zealand, specialising in high-quality loose teas, green, oolong, and black tea. Zealong are organic or conversion organic certified, Halal certified, and ISO 22000 / HACCP certified.

The climate, terroir, and lack of heavy frost in Hamilton aid in growing the camellia sinensis tea plant and encouraged initial propagation trials in 1996. In January 2010, the company opened a restaurant on its plantation, Camellia Tea House.

A successful export company and a Waikato icon cited for its innovative approach, ambition and support to the local economy, Zealong has attracted media attention overseas, particularly in China and Taiwan, the origin of this type of tea. A popular New Zealand investigation programme, Campbell Live, showcased Zealong in 2009 and case-studied the company as part of their subject on counterfeit products and the historical drought that hit the country in 2013. In September 2016, Zealong signed an export agreement with German tea retailer TeeGschwendner.
