= Sabah Tea =

Malaysian tea company

Sabah Tea Sdn Bhd
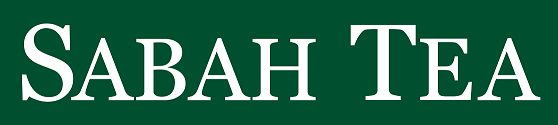
- Company type: Private Limited Company
- Industry: Tea
- Founded: 1973; 53 years ago in Ranau, Sabah, Malaysia
- Headquarters: Sedco Industrial Estate, Kota Kinabalu, Malaysia
- Owners: Sabah Tea Sdn Bhd and Desa Tea Sdn Bhd (member of the Yee Lee Corporation Bhd)
- Website: www.sabahtea.com.my

Sabah Tea Sdn Bhd (doing business as Sabah Tea) is the main tea company in the state of Sabah, Malaysia since 1973. Originally owned by Sabah Tea Sdn Bhd and Desa Tea Sdn Bhd, it is the largest tea producer in Borneo, with both domestic and international distribution, especially after becoming part of Yee Lee Corporation Bhd, which increased exports both locally and internationally.

== History ==
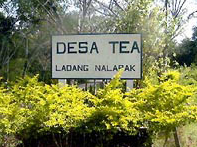
The Nalapak tea farm signboard in Ranau.

In 1976, the Sabah state government gazetted 6,200 acres of land in Kg Nalapak, Ranau District to Rural Development Co-operation (Koperasi Pembangunan Desa) (KPD). The land was then converted into a tea farm and on 26 April 1978, the farm was incorporated into Sabah Tea with a subsidy from KPD to manage and operate the farm. The farm opening was officiated by the Malaysian Prime Minister Mahathir Mohamad on 19 February 1984. In 1987, the management of Sabah Tea united with the British company, Tate & Lyle and the Commonwealth Development Corporation to reduce the financial burden on the government. Following the unification, Sabah Tea was able to participate in the farming industry competitively with other tea plantations. Since 1997, Yee Lee Corporation Bhd has taken the total share of Sabah Tea and Desa Tea Sdn Bhd, a company from Ipoh, Perak that specialises in the manufacturing, export, and sale of products both locally and internationally.

== See also ==
- List of tea companies
