= Ten Fu Group =

Chinese tea company

Tenfu Group
- Company type: Private
- Industry: Materials
- Founded: 1993; 33 years ago
- Headquarters: Zhangzhou, Fujian, China
- Products: Tea
- Parent: Ten Ren Tea
- Website: www.tenfu.com

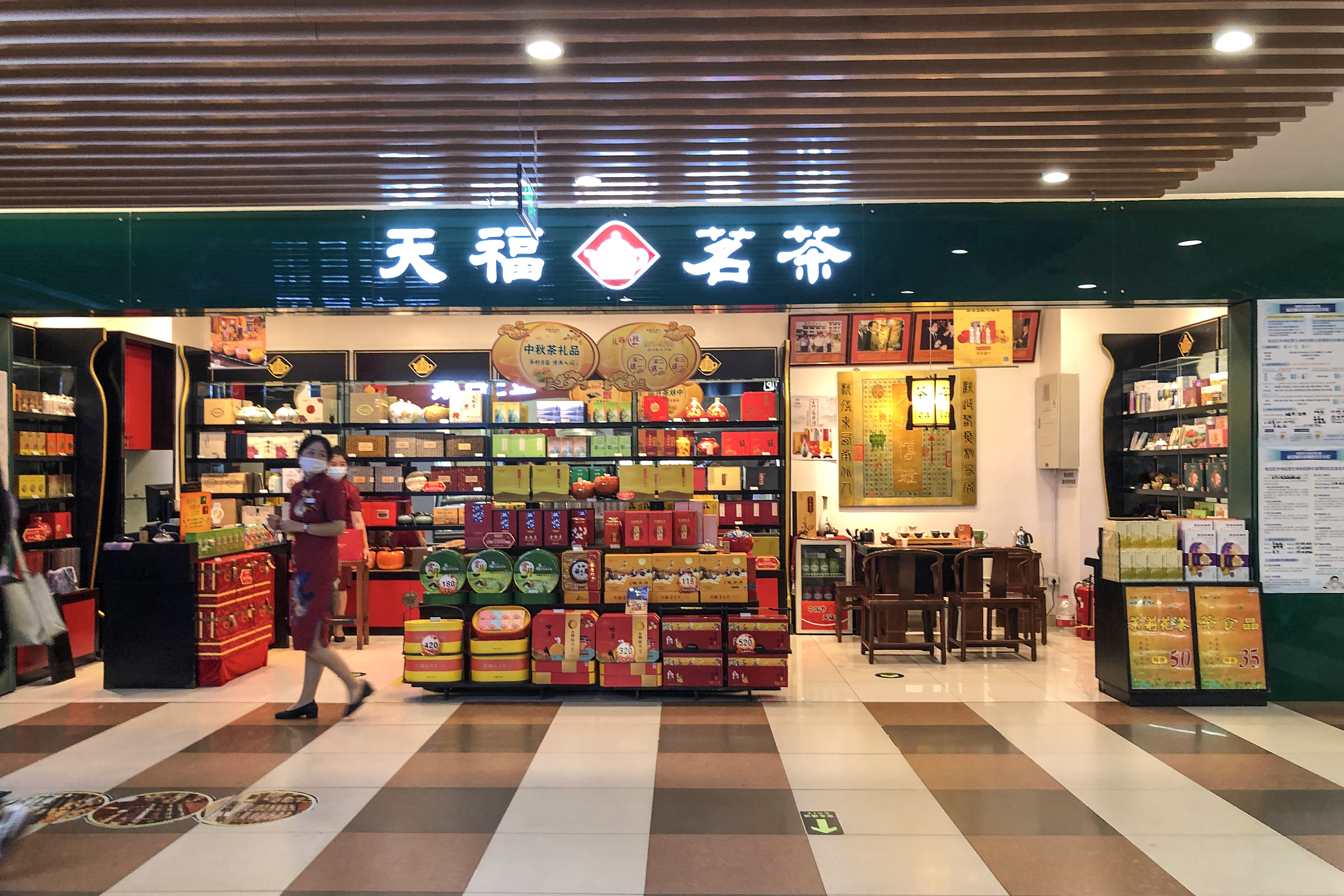
Ten Fu's Tea store at a BHG Mall in Beijing

Tenfu Tea or Ten Fu (also Tian Fu Tea; Chinese: 天福茗茶; pinyin: Tiānfú Míngchá) is the name of a China-based company that specializes in tea and tea food products.

== See also ==
- Tenfu Tea College
