= Imperial Tea Court =

American tea company

- Company type: Private
- Industry: Beverage
- Founded: San Francisco, California, 1993
- Founder: Roy and Grace Fong
- Headquarters: San Francisco, United States
- Number of locations: Two
- Products: International teas
- Website: imperialtea.com

The Imperial Tea Court is a privately owned American company that provides fine teas from China, India, Taiwan and Japan, to the U.S. wholesale and retail markets. The Imperial Tea Court was the first authentic tearoom in San Francisco's Chinatown, serving black tea, green tea, white tea, yellow tea, jasmine tea and puerh tea. The tearoom is widely known for its traditional style of tea.

The tearoom opened in San Francisco in Chinatown in 1993. That location has closed; current locations are in San Francisco's Ferry Building and in nearby Berkeley. In 2012 the Fongs organized San Francisco's first Tea Festival at their Ferry Building location.

== Published works ==
- Fong, Roy (2012). The Great Teas of China. Oakland: Tea Journey Books. ISBN 978-0578041957.
