= Alghazaleen Tea =

Ceylon tea brand

Alghazaleen Tea for sale in Rockville, Maryland.

Alghazaleen Tea is a brand of Ceylon tea, grown and packed in Sri Lanka (Ceylon). It is popular in Jordan, Palestine, UAE, and Afghanistan and is manufactured by Akbar Brothers Ltd. Alghazaleen is imported to Jordan by the Amman-based Palestinian Trading Company. The tea is grown in the mountains of central Ceylon, and the Earl Grey variety is made using oil from the bergamot fruit. Akbar and Alghazaleen brands won the Sri Lanka Institute of Marketing's award for the brand of the year in 2003 and in 2005. Sixty million cups of Akbar Brothers tea products are consumed daily.
