= Teavana =

Tea company owned by Starbucks

Teavana Corporation
- Logo used since 2015 until 2018

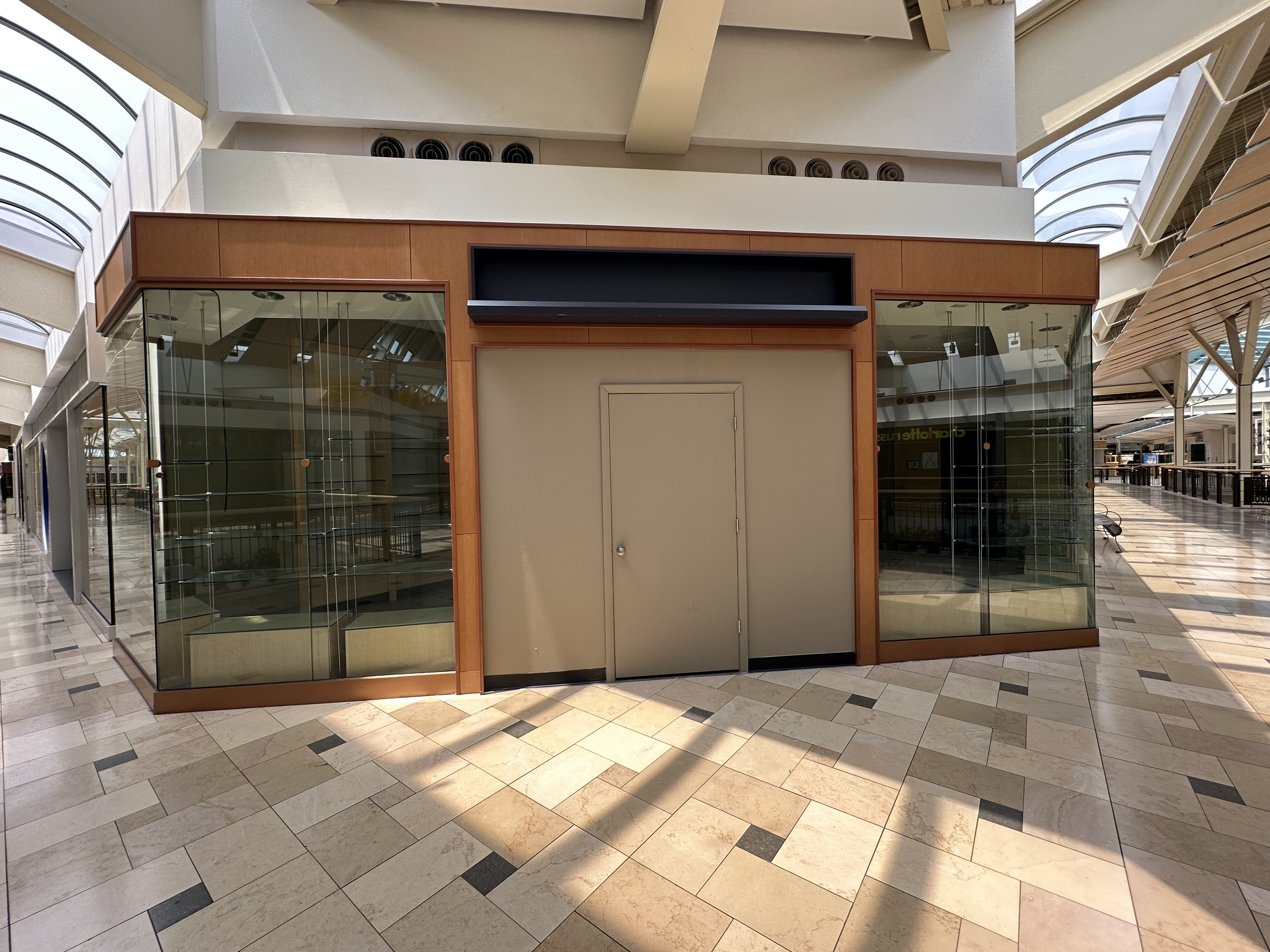
- A closed Teavana location in Exton, Pennsylvania.
- Type: Subsidiary
- Industry: Beverage
- Founded: 1997; 29 years ago Phipps Plaza; Atlanta, Georgia, U.S.
- Defunct: 2018; 8 years ago
- Fate: Closed from all Simon malls.
- Headquarters: 2401 Utah Avenue South, Seattle, Washington, U.S.
- Products: Loose-Leaf Tea; Made-to-order tea beverages Tea-Related Products
- Parent: Starbucks (2012–present)

Teavana Corporation was an American tea company, which previously had locations throughout the United States, Canada, Mexico, and the Middle East. Starbucks acquired Teavana in 2012, and in 2017, Starbucks announced it would close all Teavana locations by 2018. As of 2022, a very limited variety of Teavana products continue to be sold at Starbucks.

== History ==
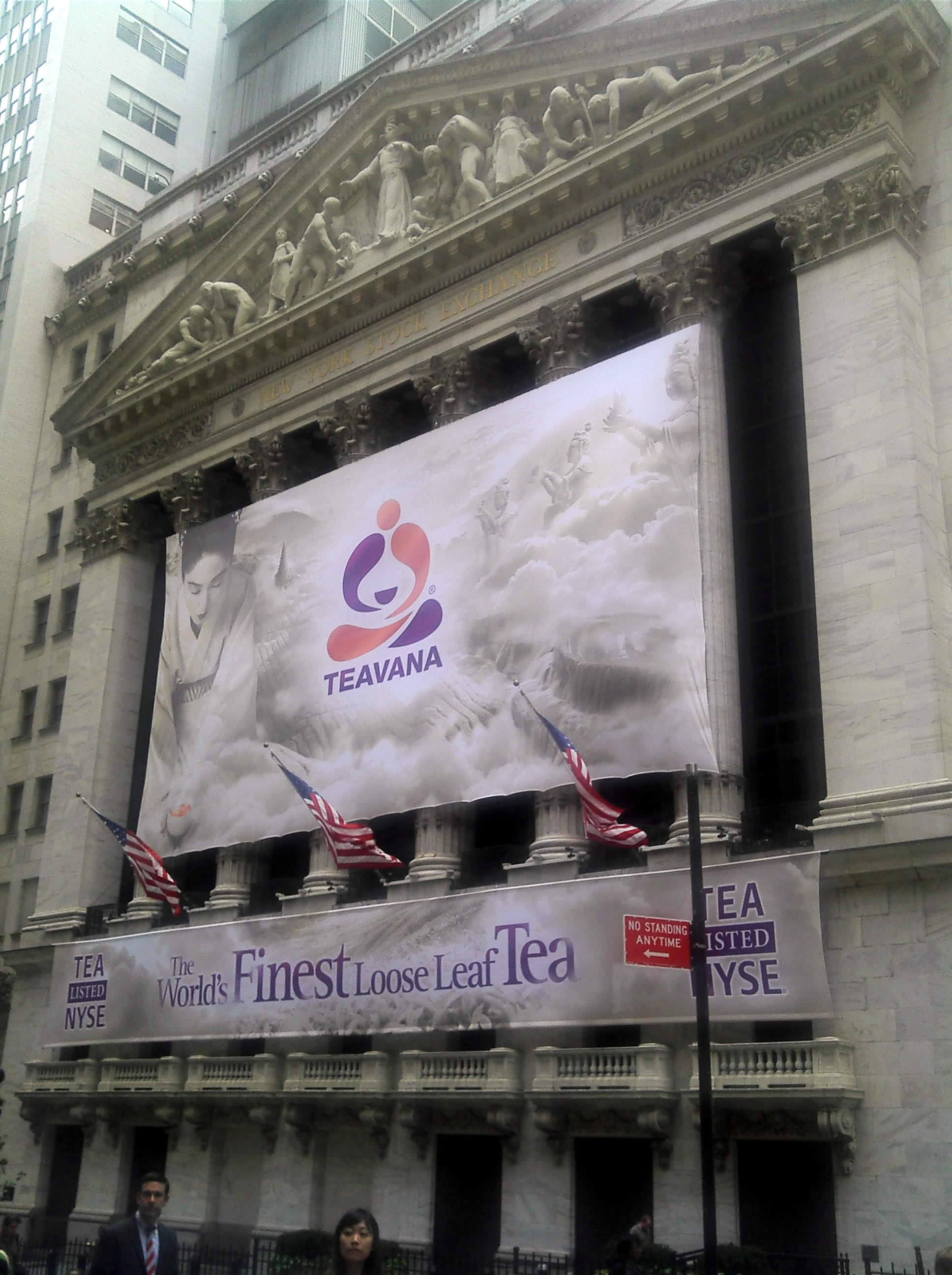
The New York Stock Exchange on July 28, 2011, when Teavana had its initial public offering, which raised roughly $121 million

Teavana was started in Atlanta, Georgia, in 1997, with the opening of a teahouse at Phipps Plaza. Teavana was founded by Andrew T. Mack, and his wife, who invested their life savings into the business. Their idea was inspired by a road trip, noticing the gravitation of Americans towards fine wines and coffees in the United States.

In late 2012, Starbucks stated that it would pay $620 million in cash to buy the company. Three class-action lawsuits were commenced by shareholders of Teavana concerning the Starbucks buyout; these were settled on December 14, 2012 (subject to court approval). The acquisition of Teavana by Starbucks was formally closed on December 31, 2012. Teavana joined the Ethical Tea Partnership (ETP) in 2015. On July 27, 2017, Starbucks announced it would close all 379 Teavana stores by 2018, partly due to underperformance.

Simon Property Group, one of the largest U.S. mall operators, demanded Starbucks keep running the Teavana shops located in its malls, arguing in part that their closing would reduce traffic to surrounding stores and in December 2017 a judge ruled in Simon's favor. On September 15, 2017, Cadillac Fairview sued Starbucks over Teavana closures in Canada.

However, on January 18, 2018, Simon and Starbucks reached an agreement that would close the remaining 77 Teavana stores in Simon malls, ending the tea shop's existence as independent storefronts after nearly 21 years in business.

== Products ==
Teavana offered hot tea sachets and premade iced tea which are sold at Starbucks locations, as well as at supermarkets and external retailers where tea is sold.

Prior to the closure of all of their storefront locations, Teavana's retail stores were usually located in upscale shopping malls and designed to be "part tea bar, part tea emporium." Individual cups of tea to go were offered for sale, and the retail locations offered free samples of various tea blends and tea varieties at their front door and within the store. Accessories for tea-drinking, such as cups and pots were also available in the stores.

Teavana previously offered loose-leaf teas and herbal infusions, with tea categories such as: white, black, green, flavored & scented green, "blooming" white, flavored & scented black, oolong, and pu-erh teas, along with rooibos, herbal, organic matcha green tea, blooming tea, and Yerba Maté infusions. Teavana retail stores had previously offered various blends of each type of tea, and frequently promoted cross-blending different types of tea. Teas were offered in several formats, such as loose-leaf tea, pre-filled tea tins, and tea sachets, or brewed as a to-go beverage.

In addition to loose tea, Teavana sold teaware products, including cast iron Tetsubin teapots, Bone China teapots, Japanese porcelain teapots and cups, stove-top kettles, electric kettles, milk frothers and automatic tea makers (produced by Australian company Breville), Japanese hot water dispensers and electric tea makers (produced by Zojirushi), tea measures, tea infusion and steeping wares such as the Teavana 'Perfectea Maker', contour tumblers, and tea infuser mugs. Teavana also sold all-natural rock sugar (non-GMO beet sugar) sourced from Belgium.

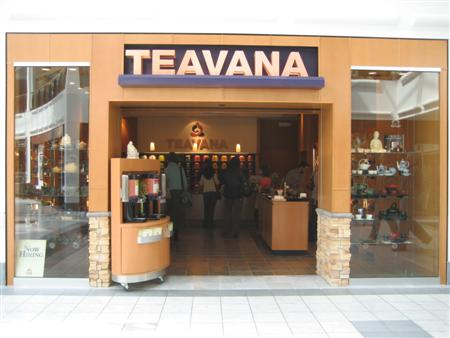
Teavana in Nashville, Tennessee, as shown in 2008

== See also ==
- Tazo, another tea brand, formerly owned by Starbucks
