= Lancashire Tea =

English tea brand

- Current owner: Lancashire Tea Company
- Country: England, UK
- Introduced: 2005; 21 years ago
- Markets: Tea
- Website: lancashiretea.co.uk

Lancashire Tea is an English brand of tea. The Lancashire Tea Company was formed by Paul Needham and business partner Lynn Hitchen in 2006 to give Lancashire its own brand and as a rival to Yorkshire Tea.

== Products ==
Including the classic black tea blend, the company blends 12 teas from Kenya, Malawi, Rwanda, and Sumatra and has extended production into Rooibos, Green Tea, and Coffee.

In 2009, the company relaunched the brand, having produced four new designs for the packaging, which were voted on by members of their Facebook group to decide which one would be their new look.

== Popular culture ==
On 13 November 2008, the Lancashire Tea Company broke two Guinness World Records for making the World's Largest Teabag and The World's Largest Cup of Tea.

In February 2015, product sales increased following a tweet by JK Rowling admitting to fans Lancashire Tea was her favourite brand. The Harry Potter author who lives in Edinburgh stated she buys it in England and takes it back to Scotland with her.
