= Betjeman & Barton =

French tea company

Coordinates: 48.87225°N 2.32135°E

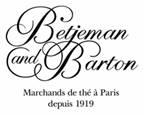
Betjeman & Barton logo

Based in Paris, France, Betjeman & Barton have been tea merchants since 1919. They offer black, perfumed, and herbal teas from around the world.

== History ==
The company was founded in 1919 by Frenchmen Betjeman and his British employee Barton. It was the first shop in Paris entirely dedicated to tea.

As of 2014, the company sells over two hundred and fifty varieties of tea. In 2018, a Betjeman & Barton opened a tea shop in Kuala Lumpur.
