= Upton Tea Imports =

American tea company

Upton Tea Imports, LLC
- Type: Private
- Industry: Mail-order Retail Tea; Online Retail Tea; Retail Beverages
- Founded: In 1989 in Upton, MA.
- Headquarters: Holliston, Massachusetts, USA
- Products: Loose-Leaf Tea and Herbal teas Teaware
- Website: uptontea.com

Upton Tea Imports is an American company, based in Holliston, Massachusetts, that sells specialty teas. The company was founded in 1989 by Tom Eck, and the trademark was acquired by The Republic of Tea in August 2016. Upton carries only loose tea and does not sell any teabags.

Upton publishes the "Upton Tea Quarterly" which is primarily a mail-order catalog of their teas but also contains historical and educational information about tea.

The company also sells teapots, including one that comes with a tea infuser with a wire mesh.
