= Té Company =

American tea company and retailer

Té Company is an American tea company and retailer located in New York City. It was founded in December 2011 by Elena Liao and specializes on Taiwanese Tea. The name Té comes from the word “tea” in Taiwanese Hokkien. The company started by importing mainly oolong teas but evolved to include all ranges of loose teas as well as caffeine-free options. They buy directly from Taiwanese tea producers.

Té Company got its start by wholesaling to fine dining restaurants in New York City. In October 2015 they pivoted to a predominantly retail operation by opening their first Tea Shop in the West Village of Manhattan, serving teas by the pots and retailing loose leaf.

In addition to tea, Té Company is also known for its tea snacks.
