= Kericho Gold =

- Product type: Tea, Fruit & Herb Infusions
- Current owner: Gold Crown Beverages (K) Ltd.
- Introduced: June 2002
- Markets: Kenya, Uganda, Rwanda and Tanzania
- Ambassador: Chef Ali Mandhry
- Tagline: A Matter of Good Taste
- Website: kerichogold.com

Kericho Gold is a premium tea brand in Kenya launched in 2002. It is a brand of Gold Crown Beverages (K) Ltd, a subsidiary of Global Tea & Commodities (K) Ltd, one of the largest exporters of Black Tea in Kenya.

== Formats ==
Kericho Gold is packed in loose leaf tea bags, string & tag tea bags, enveloped tea bags and tagless round tea bags.

== Blends ==
Blends range from black teas, green teas, fruit and herb infusions.

== Tea variants/products ==
- Black tea
- Speciality teas
- Health and wellness
- Attitude tea
- Luxury pyramid teas
