= Harney & Sons =

American tea company

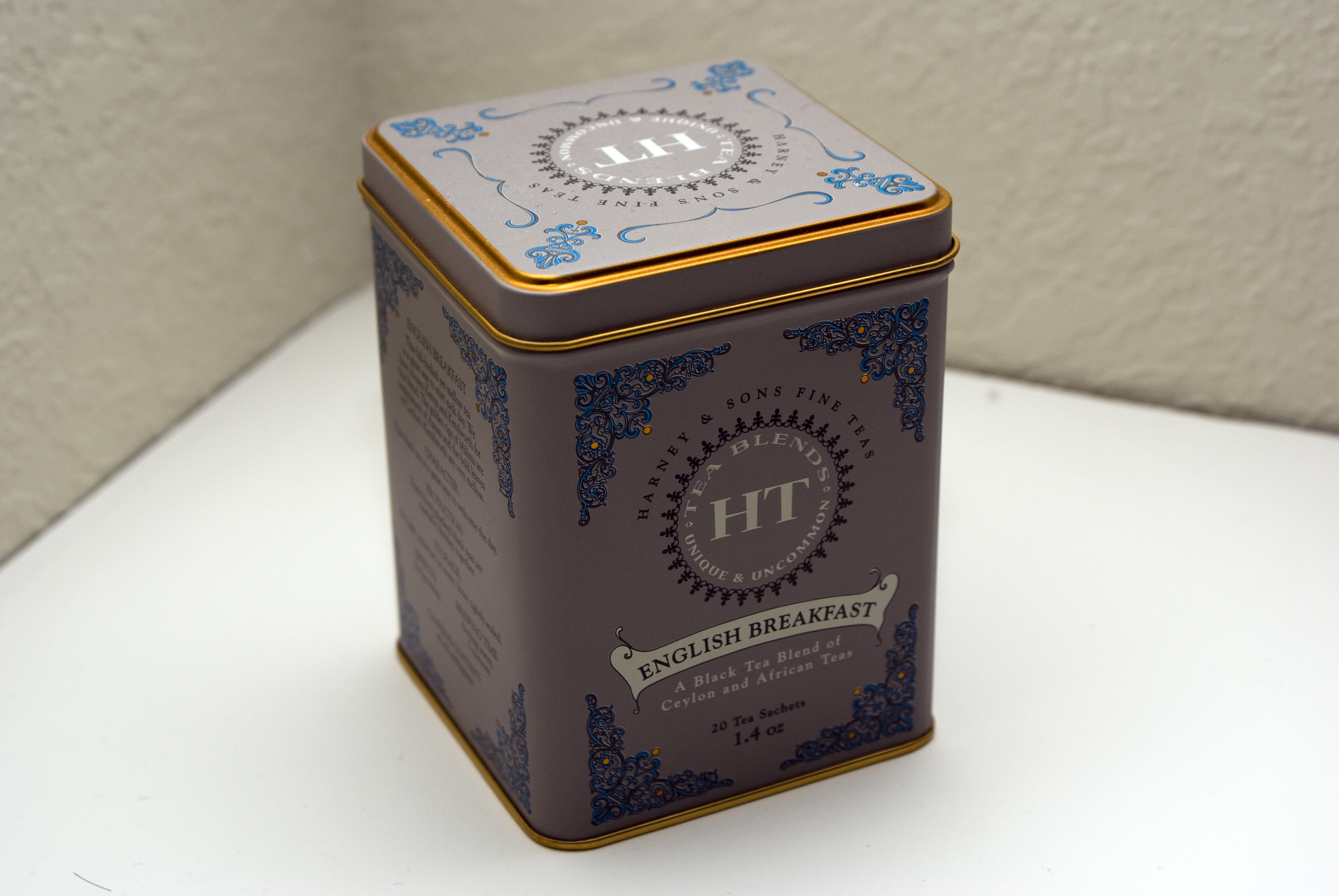
A metal tea box of Harney & Sons's English Breakfast Tea.

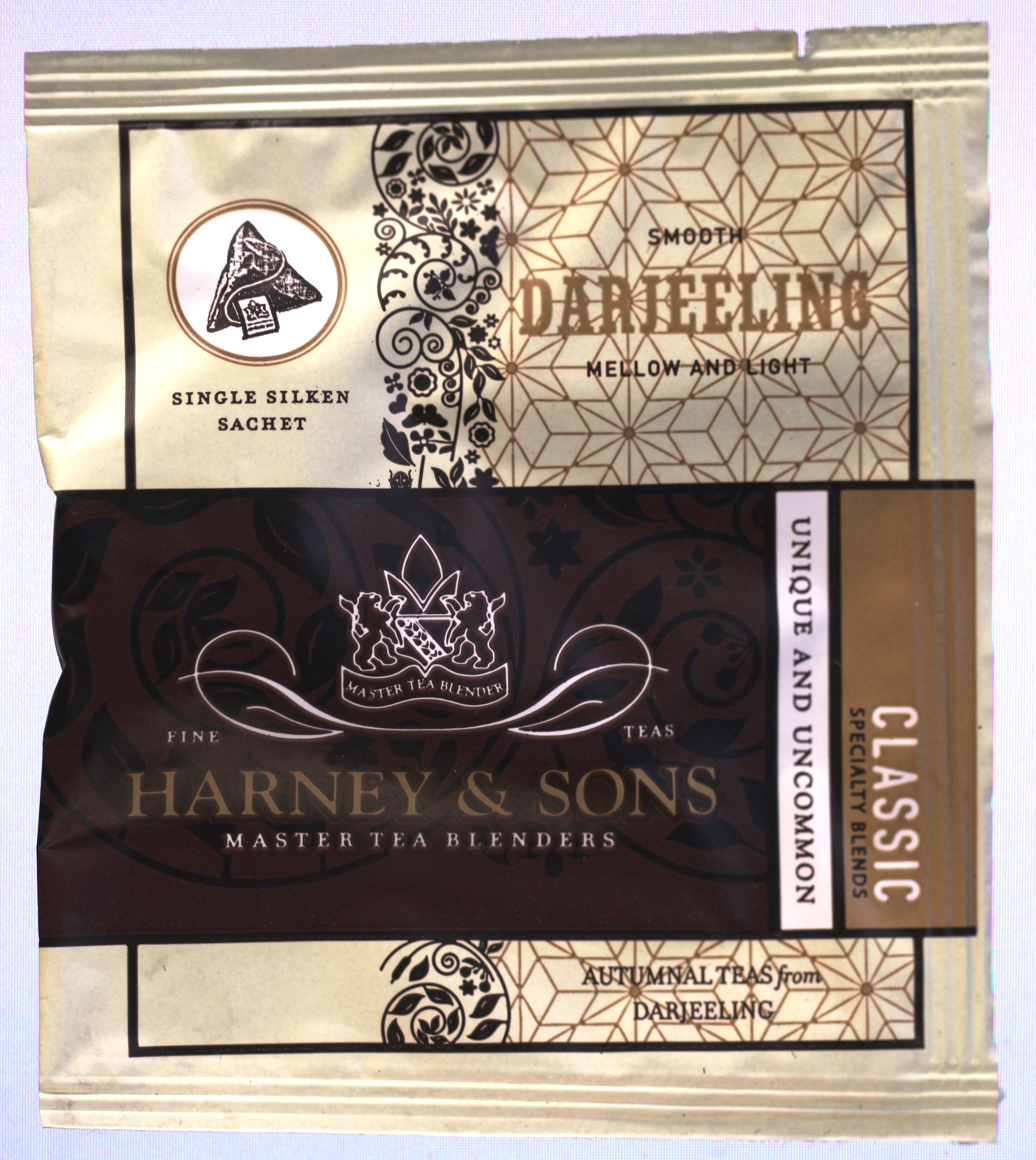
Harney & Son Darjeeling tea bag.

Harney & Sons is an American tea company founded in 1983 in Salisbury, Connecticut, and now located in Millerton, New York. It specializes in high-quality loose teas and herbal teas, and offers several products that are organic and certified kosher. In addition to loose teas, the company offers selected blends packaged in tetrahedral "silken sachet" tea bags, and other teas in standard tea bags.

Harney & Sons distributes to restaurants, hotels, and specialty shops. Institutions that serve its teas include Barnes & Noble cafés, Four Seasons Hotels, and the Hotel Affinia in Chicago. A Harney & Sons tasting room and tea shop is located in Millerton, where the company has a factory. On November 16, 2010, the company opened a tasting room in Soho, New York City. The Harney and Sons Guide to Tea, co-authored by Michael Harney (son of company founder John Harney), was nominated for a James Beard Foundation book award in 2009.

The company reports about $30 million in annual sales and employs 150 people. It imports about a million pounds of tea each year, which it sells in the United States and abroad in a wide variety of styles and packages at prices ranging from $2 to $500 a pound.

The founder, John Harney, died on June 17, 2014, in his home in Salisbury, Connecticut, from a heart attack at the age of 83.
