= Harada Tea Processing Co., Ltd. =

Japanese tea company

- Harada Logo
- Native name: ハラダ製茶株式会社
- Company type: Private KK
- Industry: Tea processing, distribution Tea plantation management (Shizuoka and Kagoshima prefectures); Restaurant management
- Founded: 1917 (as private enterprise); 1948 (incorporated)
- Headquarters: Shimada City, Shizuoka, Japan; 194 Iwamachi, Shimada-shi, Shizuoka, Japan
- Products: Green tea, coffee, black tea, oolong tea, nori, shiitake, gift items, etc.
- Operating income: ▲¥20,600 million (2012)
- Number of employees: 340 (595 in related sales departments)
- Website: www.harada-tea.co.jp (English)

Harada Tea Processing Co., Ltd. (ハラダ製茶株式会社, Harada Seicha Kabushiki Gaisha) is a Japanese tea and foods processing, packaging and distribution company based in Shimada City, Japan.

== Outline ==
Harada was founded in 1917 and incorporated as a kabushiki gaisha in 1948. Its business activities are distributed between tea processing, packaging and distribution and the management of several company-owned and contracted tea plantations.

The company gained wider recognition in Japan from its long-running series of Yabukita Blend television advertisements.
