= Argo Tea =

Chain of tea cafes in Chicago, US

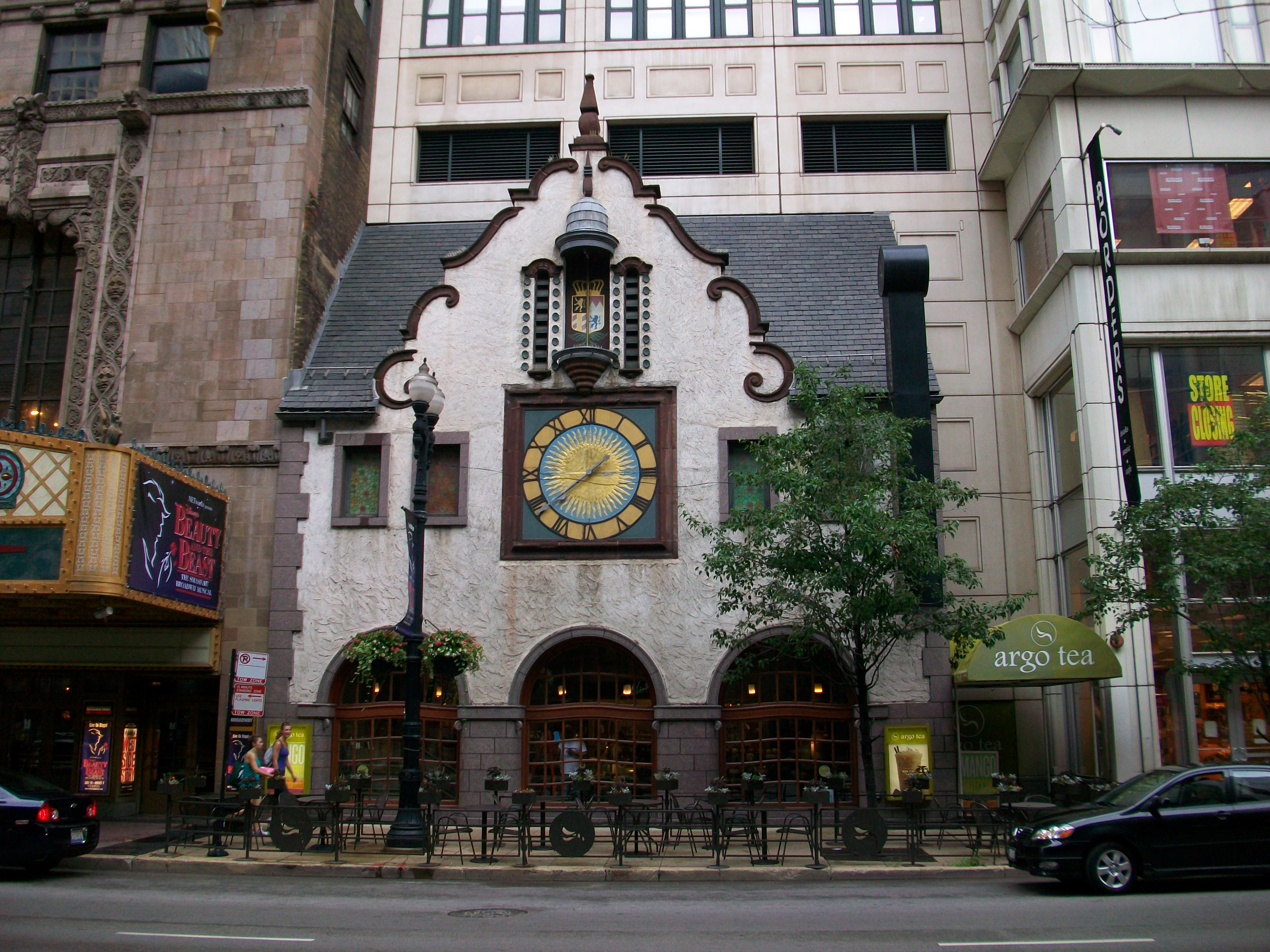
- Argo Tea former headquarters on Randolph St. in the Chicago Loop
- Type: Subsidiary
- Industry: Restaurants; Retail Tea and Coffee; Wholesale Tea
- Founded: June 2003; 23 years ago at 958 West Armitage Ave. Chicago, IL 60614
- Founder: Arsen Avakian; Daniel Lindwasser; Simon Simonian
- Number of locations: 8 (2023), all located on college campuses
- Products: Signature tea drinks Loose tea leaves Bottled beverages Coffee; Teaware
- Parent: Planting Hope
- Website: www.argotea.com

Argo Tea began as a chain of tea cafes that was founded in the Lincoln Park community area in Chicago, Illinois, in June 2003. It eventually expanded to a dozen locations in the Chicago metropolitan area before expanding to New York City in 2010, where it opened four locations, and then further expanded to St. Louis and Boston. As of October 2011 the chain had 26 teahouses and distribution in over 3,000 grocery stores. By spring 2013, it also opened a location in Beirut with plans to add locations in five Middle East cities by year end.

Argo Tea primarily sold hot and cold tea-based signature drinks. It also offered about three dozen international varieties of loose-leaf tea (tea brewed from loose tea leaves, as opposed to tea leaves in bagged tea), coffee, baked goods, small entrées, and teaware. The tea menu included a variety of black, green, white teas, and natural herbal teas, served hot or iced. Argo Tea formed a special relationship with Whole Foods Market to distribute Argo products. According to a description in Bloomberg Businessweek, Argo's specialty foods include pastries, sandwiches, salads, and quiches. Argo markets from a lifestyle perspective with awareness of modern design and sustainable environment. It also sells audio CDs.

In 2020, Argo Tea began selling bottled tea products in Walgreens and other stores, and gradually closed their cafes. Golden Fleece Beverages, Inc. purchased the Argo Tea brand, and has continued to operate the business as Argo Tea. Loose tea is sold online.

== History ==
Following the famous dictum about New York real estate, Avakian takes the locations of his stores very seriously. He says he spends weeks lurking on street corners to scope out his perfect blend of attributes: high daytime foot traffic, a demographic he describes as trend-setting women in their 20s to 40s, and concentrations of neighborhood residents (as opposed to tourists). His scouting methods include chatting with falafel vendors, bar owners and even homeless men and women to get granular detail on the blocks he considers.

— The Wall Street Journal

Argo set out to be the Starbucks of tea. Argo Tea was launched in 2003 by three partners: Arsen Avakian, Simon Simonian, and Daniel Lindwasser. Avakian and Simonian are boyhood friends from Armenia. They grew up in Yerevan and emigrated in the 1990s to the United States, where Simonian, a computer scientist, and Avakian, a startup company specialist, teamed up following the dot-com bubble. Avakian first came to the United States as a Fulbright scholar. Lindwasser is a Frenchman who moved to the U.S. in 1997. He is a former management consultant. Avakian's father, Yuri, holds multiple wind and solar technology patents.

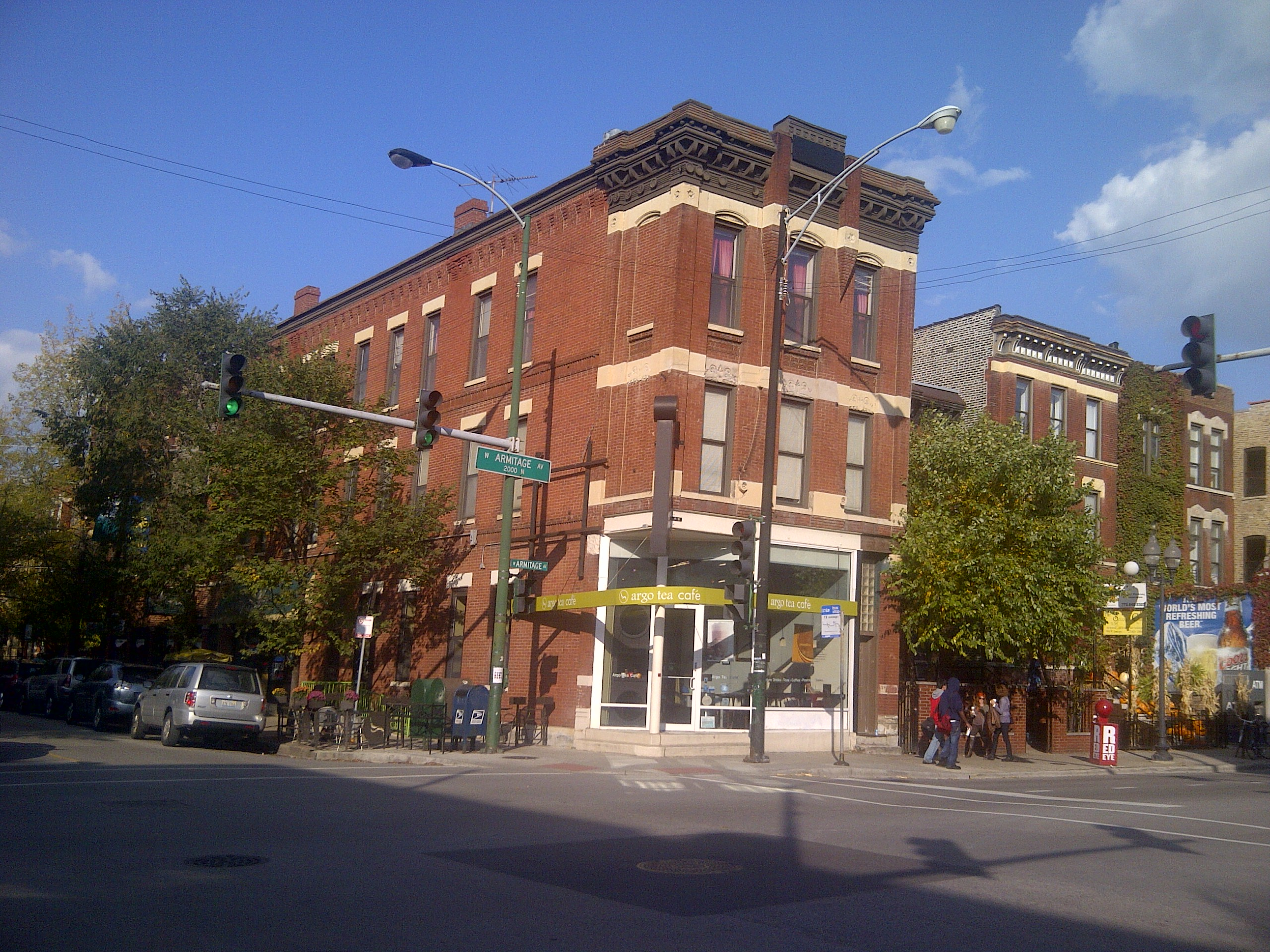
The original Argo Tea location operated until April 30, 2013.

The original 900-square-foot (84 m^{2}) cafe for Argo Tea, which had 24 indoor seats and 20 patio seats in its 2003 configuration, is located at 958 West Armitage Avenue on the corner of Sheffield Avenue in Chicago. The venture, which opened in June 2003, was the first tea cafe in Lincoln Park. It was across the street from a Starbucks. Argo borrowed its name from the story of Jason and the Argonauts in Greek mythology. The original store was financed by its founders, who were all experienced management consultants, without outside investors. They used their own credit cards as lines of credit. Chicago architect Mark A. Cuellar was hired to design Argo's early cafe interiors.

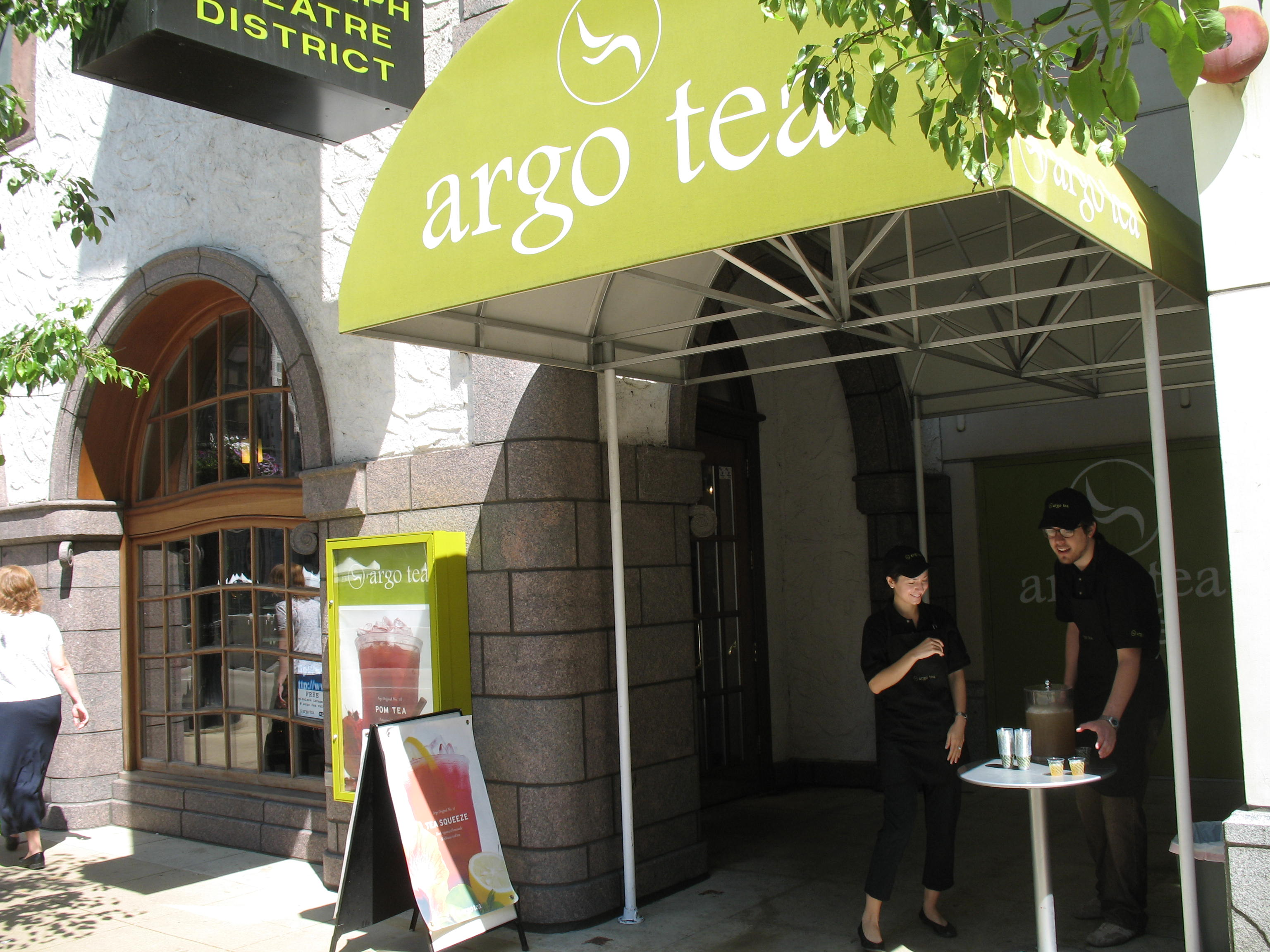
Employees passing out drink samples at the current headquarters

At first, the company experimented with expansion by distributing boxed dry tea at Whole Foods, but quickly restrategized. Barely six months after opening, Argo was planning expansion in Chicago and beyond. Late in 2004, Argo signed a lease to make its first expansion beyond its original location (at Loyola University in the Near North Side community area on Rush Street). By the beginning of 2006, there was a third location (in the Loop community area on Randolph Street near State) with a fourth on the way. In March 2006, Argo expanded to the South Side of Chicago at the University of Chicago Medical Center, which is located in the Hyde Park community area, with a location that is described as a teaosk, a themed kiosk. By 2007, the company decided to pursue consistency across its locations and began a centralized concentrate brewing process. After five years, the franchise had 10 locations ranging from 1,000 to 2,000 square feet (93 to 186 m^{2}), all in Chicago. In Chicago, several of the early cafes, including the 11th inside Merchandise Mart and the 13th at O'Hare International Airport, have been located in close proximity to a Starbucks storefronts with the thought that Starbucks is expanding demand for tea. By February 2009, the company was still a Chicago metropolitan area business with all 13 of its locations. In July 2011, Argo became the first outside retail tenant of the Tribune Tower in six years when it leased space.

Argo Tea Expansion

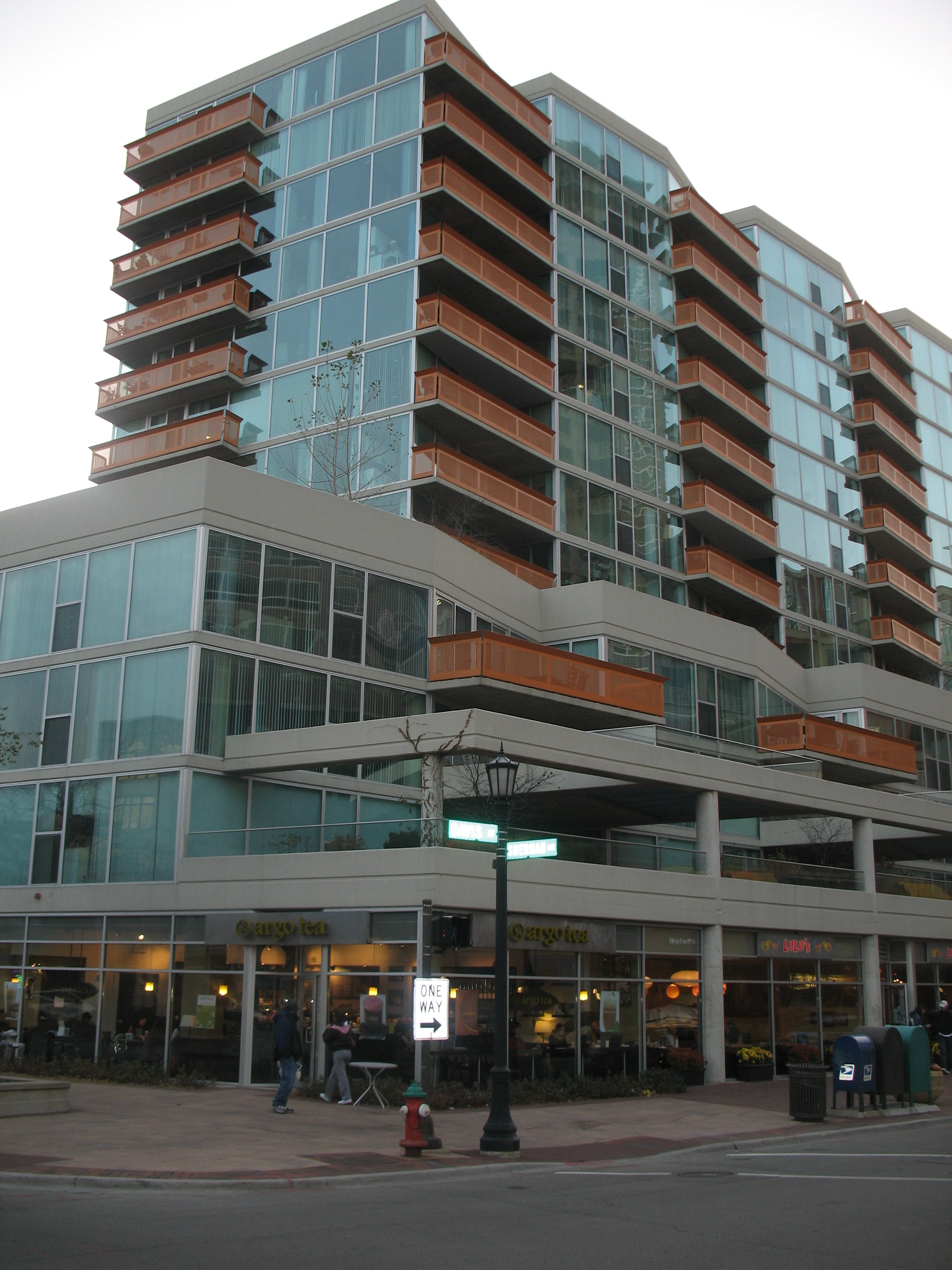
1st cafe outside of Chicago: Evanston, IL

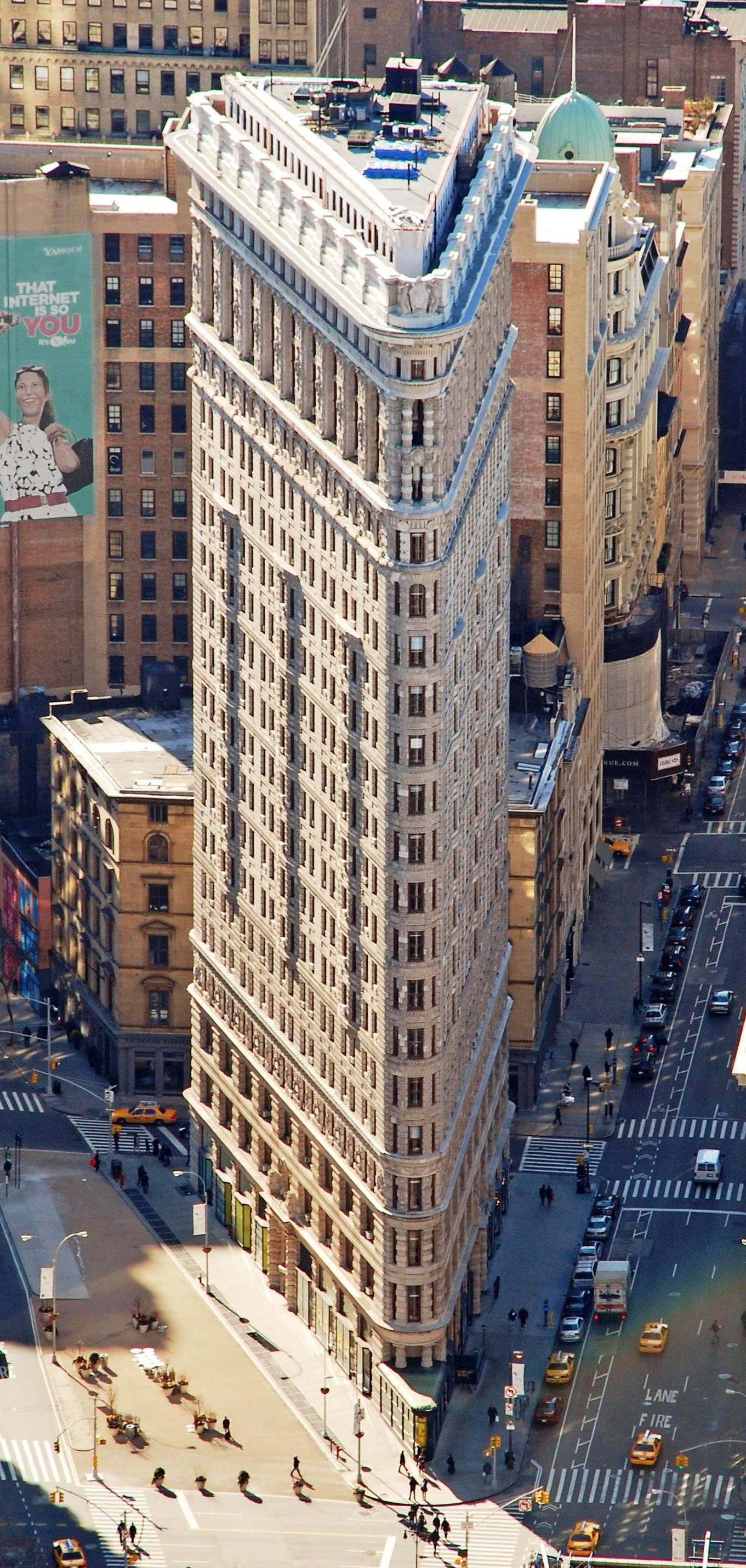
1st cafe outside of Chicago metropolitan area: New York City, Flatiron Building

Argo opened its flagship New York City location in January 2010 by signing a 10-year lease in the Flatiron Building. It promptly followed with a Chelsea neighborhood storefront and then a Columbus Circle store in the spring. It opened a total of four cafes in New York City in 2010, taking advantage of the late-2000s recession, which allowed the company to procure prime retail locations such as Union Square, Columbus Circle and the Flatiron District at reasonable rates. The business replaced a Dean & Deluca in the Union Square neighborhood. Among the investors in the New York City expansion were Sam Zell, Glen Tullman and Oxford Capital. In May 2011, the company added its fifth tea room in New York City.

By 2010, the company eschewed its aspiration to be the Starbucks of tea, "Starbucks is more like Windows PC—it's old, less healthy and designed for everyone—and we want to be more like Mac: young, healthy, cool and a more unique, innovative brand." Avakian said the company hopes to build the Apple of tea. At the time, it was opening its 18th store (14 in Chicago and 4 in New York) and had $10 million in annual sales, making it the largest chain focused on tea, according to Technomic Inc.

In 2011, the San Francisco Chronicle credited Argo as being the company that caused the 21st century tea shop revolution, while Time ran a story claiming that Argo has gotten America to drink tea. As of 2011, the United States market had grown to over 3,000 tearooms, according to the Tea Association of the USA. According to Beverage Digest, between 2006 and 2009, coffee consumption declined 2.3 percent in the United States, while tea consumption rose 4.5 percent. The growth of teas has caused Starbucks to drop the word coffee from its name and build the Tazo brand. Starbucks had a total 2010 revenue of $9 billion, while the entire tea industry was $7.7 billion, including $443 million by the top 6 U.S. tea chains. By early October 2011, Argo claimed 26 locations in four cities (Chicago, New York, Boston and St. Louis) and distribution in 3,000 grocery stores around the country including Whole Foods, Safeway and Dominick's.

When the lease came up for renewal at the original location on April 30, 2013, the company did not extend the deal, but the company would open a “greenhouse” location, with mainly glass walls, near Rush Street the following month. By March 2013, bottle drinks, which they had begun in 2010 were 20% of the company's business. By that time Argo Tea had opened a business location in Beirut and had planned to follow that with one in Doha in April 2013. It also intended to open 2013 Middle East locations in Abu Dhabi, Dubai, Kuwait and Riyadh. By September 2013, Doha was opened and that month a second Beirut location opened.

Argo Tea signed a licensing agreement in October 2016 with Caribou Coffee to open co-branded stores.

In 2020, Argo Tea refocused from operating cafés to sale of bottled tea drinks, and it was purchased by Golden Fleece Beverages. The company still uses the Argo Tea brand. Argo was noted as the tenth largest seller of tea in the US in March 2021. Golden Fleece Beverages filed for Chapter 11 bankruptcy protection in October 2021 after closing all of its company-owned cafes during the COVID pandemic.

Sustainable foods company Planting Hope bought the company's intellectual property and most of its assets August 2023. Planting Hope plans to discontinue the manufacturing and distribution of Argo's ready-to-drink tea products to focus on selling licenses to operators of branded cafes. At the time of the sale, Argo had eight remaining franchised cafes, all of which were located on College campuses and operated by food service companies.

== Products ==
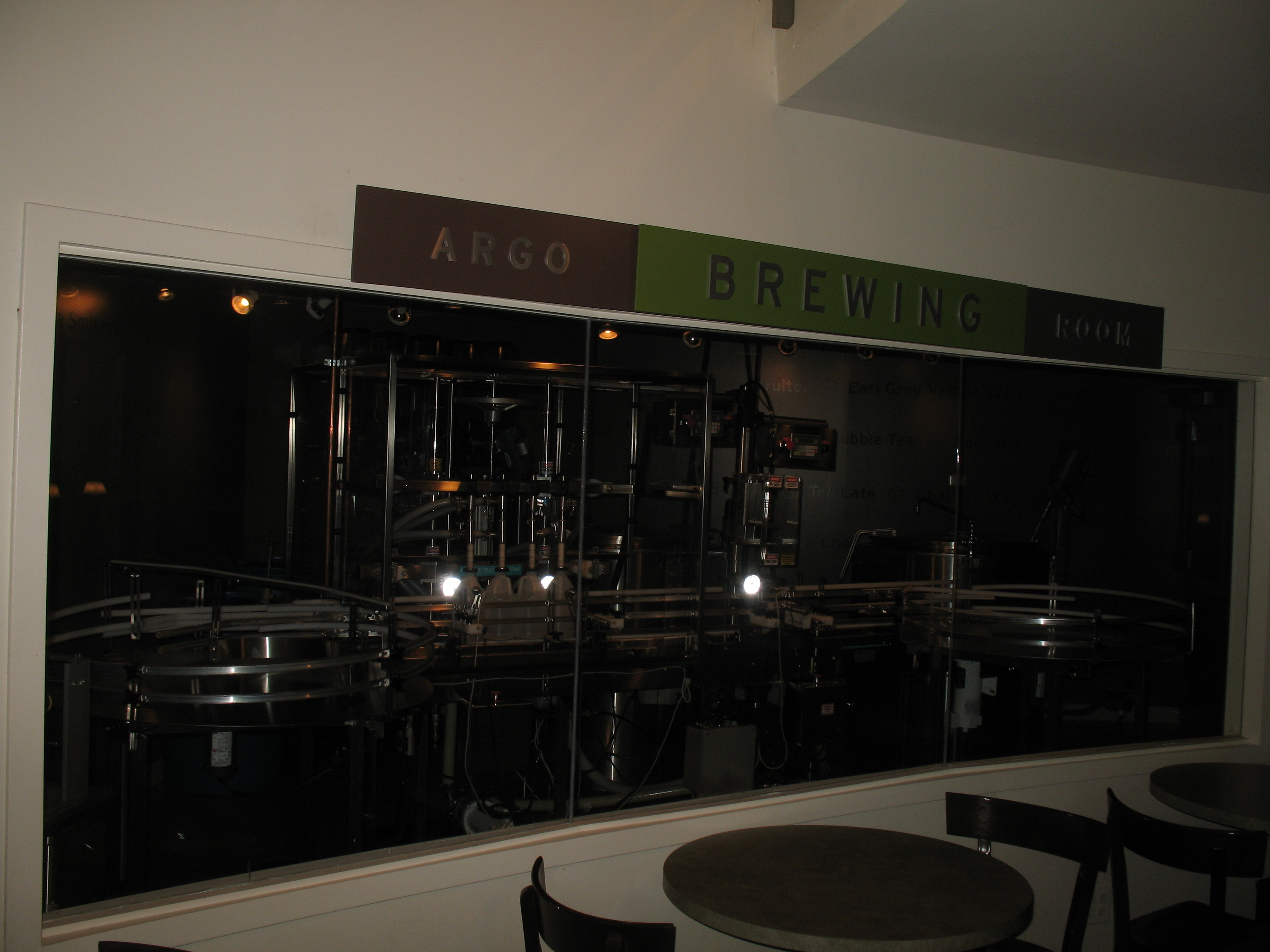
Brewing room at State and Randolph, July 2, 2006

Tea is the second most consumed beverage in the world, after water. Argo was founded in response to a realization that Americans had so few tea offerings that they generally were unfamiliar with anything but bagged teas. At the time, most tea retailers either supplied bulk tea for home brewing or traditional sit-down service, but Argo focused on premium specialty drinks in paper cups. Meanwhile, a minority of Asian immigrants from countries such as India, Vietnam and China where tea is the national beverage were spreading some of their traditions. Argo endeavored to emphasize the healthy aspects of tea as an alternative to coffee. When it was founded, Argo was part of a field of blossoming tea cafe franchises meeting a burgeoning demand. By 2002, there were 1,100 tearooms with sit-down service. In 2003, retail sales of tea totaled $5.1 billion, and in 2005, as the specialty tea market was growing 20 percent per year, the total retail tea market was expected to surpass $10 billion by 2010.

Argo began with 35 teas from around the world, including black tea, green tea and chamomile tisane as well as exotic teas. From the outset, it included a mix of traditional Asian teas as well as teas from exotic locations. One of the companies staple drinks came from a vacation to Ipanema beach in Rio de Janeiro in which Avakian paid a juice bar operator to close shop to allow him to experiment with flavor combinations during business hours. Several of Argo's teas are seasonal. One of its signature drinks is the teappuccino, a black tea mixed with steamed milk and froth, which the company has trademarked. The menu leverages the new wave of specialty teas that may be served sweetened or spiced and that are blended with milk, sparkling water or fruit juices. In the early years, its favorite offerings were Bubble tea, Pomegranate tea, Matte Latte or Chai tea and milk and Tea sangria.

In its first years, the company sold illy brand coffee. While the company imports its teas from sources around the world, it now brews its teas at a centralized location in downtown Chicago. Argo started out selling loose tea in 1- and 4-ounce bags or in bulk. Among Argo's Americanized drink varieties is a version of the national drink of both Argentina and Uruguay, the mate, which Argo serves as a Mate late. By 2010, the company ventured into the grocery store market (Whole Foods and Treasure Island) with bottled specialty teas in Chicago and had plans for its own bottling facility. By the time the company opened its New York locations, it offered fair trade certified coffee. In 2011, the company expanded its distribution to grocery stores around the country.

According to the company's press release for the opening of its 20th location in 2011, the menu included "all natural tea-based signature drinks, over 30 varieties of loose leaf teas, fair-trade organic coffee, fresh-baked pastries, specialty foods, and a selection of teaware and accessories. The signature drink menu features healthy and unique options such Maté Laté with earthy maté, almond and milk, Green Tea Ginger Twist with Japanese green tea and ginger root, MojiTea with cool mint tea and lime juice as well as many others. The food menu features a wide assortment of freshly baked gourmet pastries, French quiches, and a SpecialTea Foods made with tea-infused ingredients such Teanie Panini, Tea Bites and wholesome Teapot Grains. Argo Tea’s ready-to-drink bottled beverages can also be found outside the cafés, in the finest grocery retailers across the country." Bloomberg Businessweek summarized Argo Tea's business as follows: "Chicago-based Argo Tea strives to redefine the message of tea as a healthy beverage and lifestyle choice, to create unique, all-natural tea-based beverages and to provide customer experiences that reflect modern designs and a sustainable environment." The tea ware and accessories include tea pots, high-tech tea infusers, and wide variety of tea cups.

== Social efforts ==
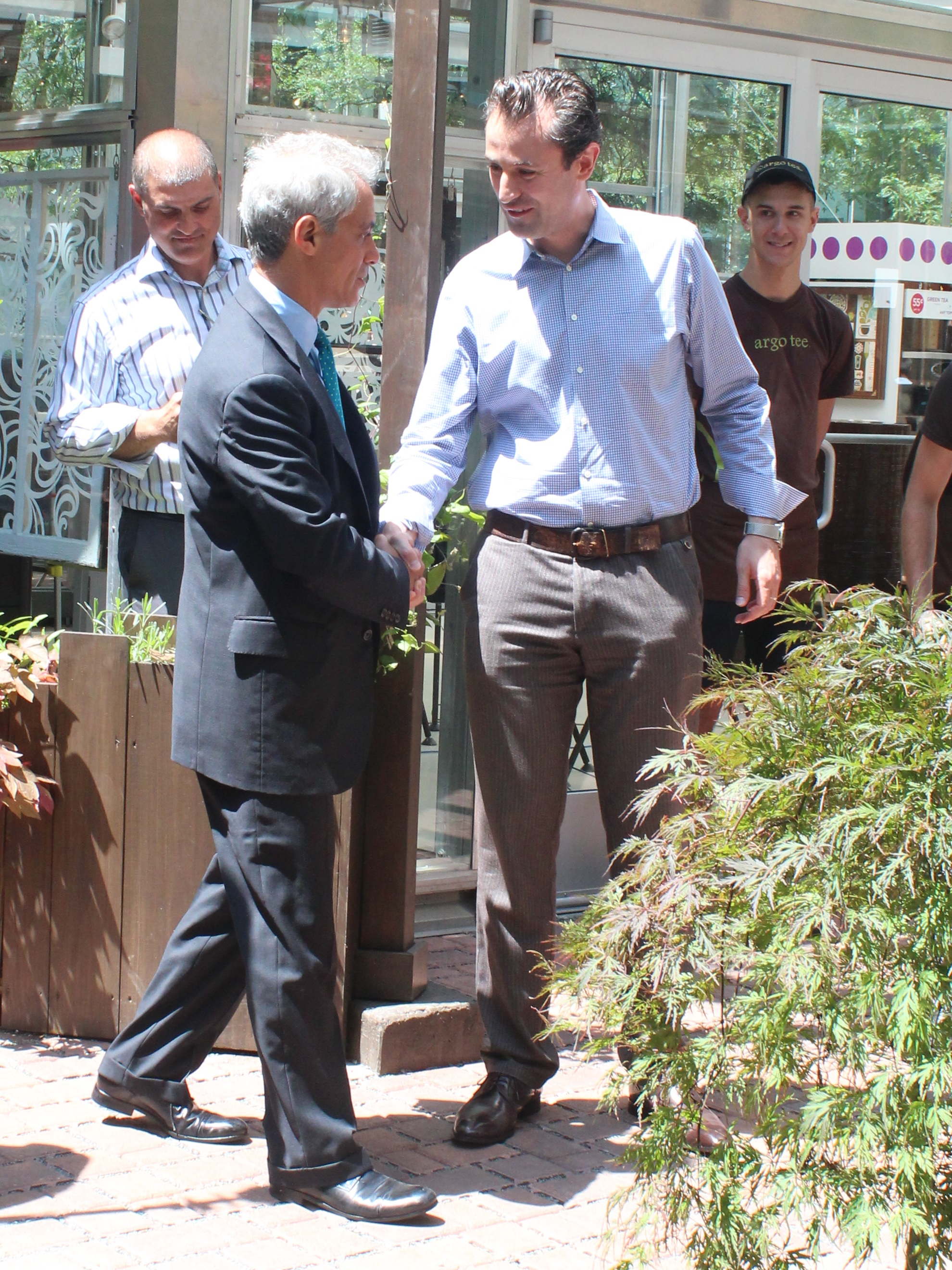
Argo's 10th anniversary tree planting at Conners Park with Chicago Mayor Rahm Emanuel and Arsen Avakian

Although there are both proponents and opponents of the health effects of tea, Argo tea is a proponent of the health benefits of tea and advocates for its use in research. Argo Tea has donated a large amount of white teas, which have high concentrations of antioxidants, to the University of Chicago Hospitals. This contribution prompted the University of Chicago to invite Argo to open the kiosk inside the hospital lobby. The company also holds tea seminars in conjunction with Northwestern University and the University of Chicago to build awareness of the possible health benefits and research possibilities for tea.

Argo Tea advocates for sustainability, demonstrates concern and awareness of environmental issues in their business plan and uses charitable donations to promote research as noted above. The company has an environmentally friendly business plan that includes encouraging use of reusable service-ware such as ceramic mugs and plates and washable silverware by its dine-in customers. Argo also markets reusable tea tumblers, which enable its customers to obtain discounted pricing on its drinks. The company considers sustainability and environmental consciousness in all phases of its business including supplier, operations, store design and product decisions.

== Corporate information ==
Although the company was founded in Lincoln Park, the official business address is at the third location in the Loop (16 West Randolph Street Chicago, IL 60601). The company has mostly part-time employees, but offers medical benefits to employees who work 20 hours per week. As of September 2008 the workforce was about 200 people.

Despite its wide-ranging menu, as of 2011, 80 percent of Argo's $15 million annual sales came from tea beverages.

In August 2011, Chicago Alderman Brendan Reilly ceded control of Connors Park in the Gold Coast to Argo Tea for development of a 1,200-square-foot (110 m^{2}) store. The area had been neglected by the Chicago Park District and become run down. In exchange for a 15-year lease, Argo assumes responsibility for maintaining the park. The business opened its location in the park within a greenhouse in late May 2013.
