= Akbar Tea =

Sri Lankan tea brand

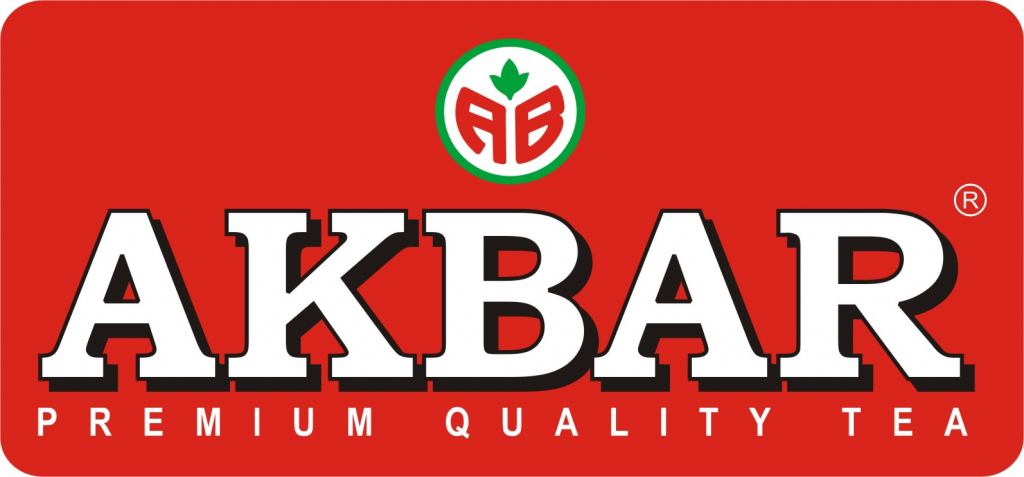
- Founded: 1969; 57 years ago
- Founders: Abbas Akbarally; Inayet Akbarally
- Headquarters: 334 T. B. Jayah Mawatha, Colombo, Sri Lanka
- Key people: Abbasally Hebtulabhoy, Inayetally Akbarally Hebtulabhoy
- Products: Tea
- Parent: Akbar Group
- Subsidiaries: Alghazaleen Tea
- Website: www.akbartea.com

Akbar Tea is a Sri Lankan tea brand owned by Akbar Brothers Ltd, along with Alghazaleen Tea. The company produces a range of tea bags, loose teas and gifts including: black tea, green tea, flavoured teas, and herbal teas. Akbar is Sri Lanka's largest tea exporter.

== History ==
Akbar Tea was formed in 1969 when Tyeabally Shaikh Hebtulabhoy's grandsons: Abbas Akbarally and Inayet Akbarally resigned from Hebtulabhoys and Co. establishing Akbar Brothers. The family has been in the food business since 1864, when Shaikh Hebtulabhoy (1834-1897) migrated from India to Sri Lanka, establishing a food import/export company based in Pettah. His son, Tyeabally Shaikh Hebtulabhoy (1888-1928), established the tea company, M. S. Hebtulabhoy and Company Limited, which commenced shipping tea overseas in 1907.

Within three years Akbar Brothers were exporting to major tea markets in the Middle East and other parts of the world. In 1972 Akbar Brothers Limited was incorporated and their father, Shaikh Akbarally (1911-2003), retired as the chairman of Hebtulabhoys and Co. joining his sons.

The firm is still owned and managed by members of the family and is Sri Lanka’s largest tea exporter. The company operates a 276,000 sq.ft. manufacturing facility in the Kelaniya district of Colombo. The parent company, Akbar Group, is also involved in property development, healthcare, and electricity generation.

In July 2022, the company expanded its operations to Oman.
