= BrewGroup =

New Zealand tea and coffee manufacturer

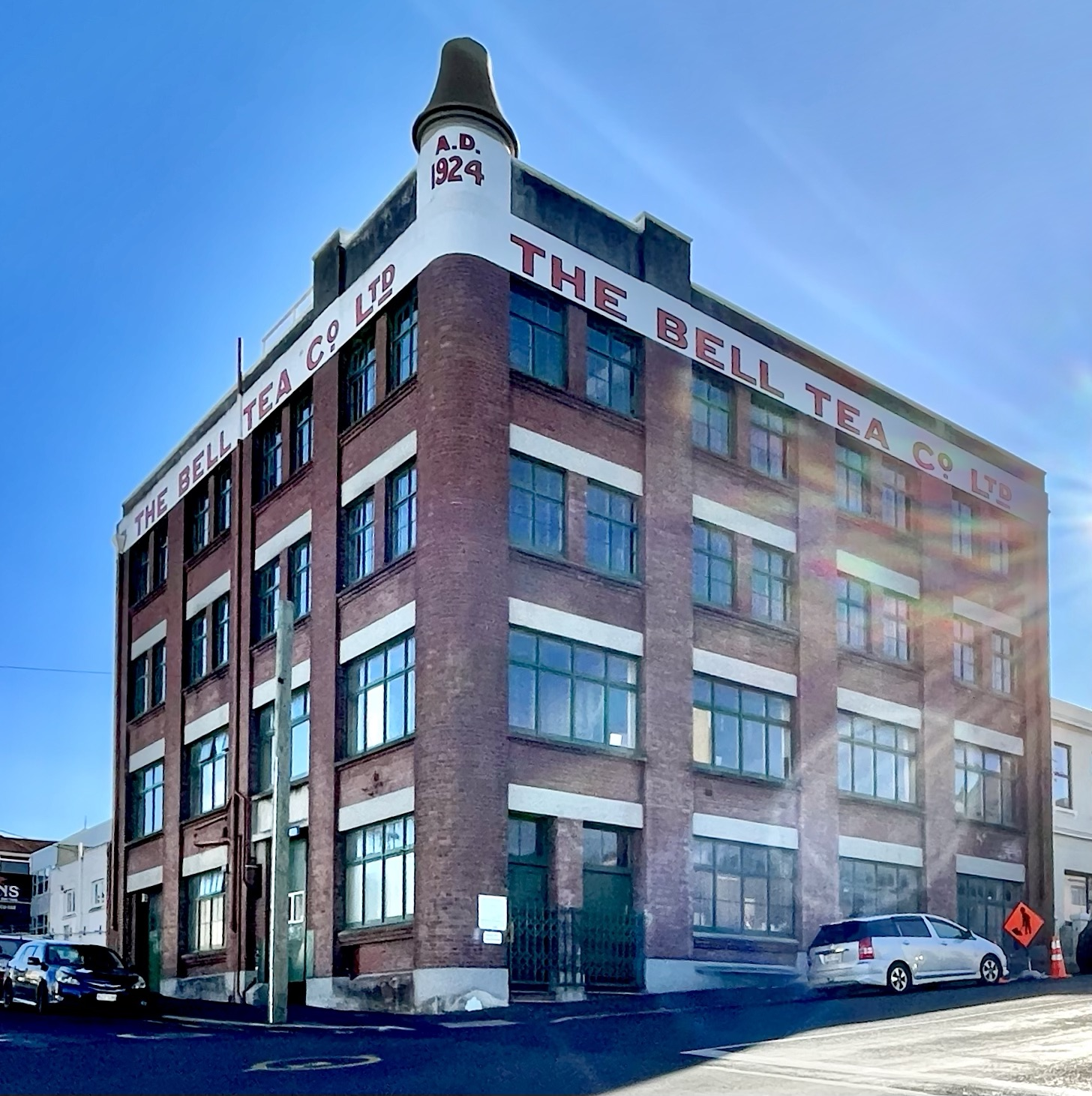
- Dunedin factory used from 1924 to 2014
- Industry: Food manufacturing
- Founded: 1898; 128 years ago in Dunedin
- Defunct: 2017
- Fate: taken over
- Successor: Jacobs Douwe Egberts NZ
- Area served: New Zealand
- Revenue: $60 million (2013)

BrewGroup was a New Zealand tea and coffee company, which started as Bell Tea in 1898. Bell Tea is the country's oldest tea manufacturer. As of 2014, over 3 million Bell Tea bags were made each day in Auckland. Its tea brands gave BrewGroup a 40% tea market share as of 2013. It was acquired by Jacobs Douwe Egberts in 2017.

== History ==
The Bell Tea Company was founded in 1898 by Norman Harper Bell after moving from Melbourne to Dunedin. Bell partnered with R. Wilson and Co. in 1898 and trademarked Bell Tea, which lasted until 1905 when he ended the partnership, bought the Bell Tea and other trademarks, and found two new partners. The company then became the Bell Tea and Coffee Co.

In 1962, Bell Tea was acquired by the supermarket operator Foodstuffs. Due to competition with Progressive Enterprises, Foodstuffs' main competitor, Bell Tea had difficulty getting into Progressive's supermarkets, which limited the growth of Bell Tea. Bell Tea was sold in September 2013 to Wellington-based Pencarrow Private Equity.

In 2006, Bell Tea bought Burton Hollis Coffee, and the company was renamed to the Bell Tea and Coffee Company.

The 2011 Christchurch earthquake severely damaged Bell Tea's Christchurch building and it had to be demolished. In 2014, Bell Tea sold its Dunedin factory, which had been used since 1924. This was because the company could not afford the costs for improving earthquake strength and fire safety, as the building had only 34% of the minimum earthquake strength. The costs were over $1 million. During that year the company also divested three of its properties in East Tāmaki, two of which were adjoined as a factory.

In June 2016, Bell Tea & Coffee Company was renamed to BrewGroup after coffee sales exceeded tea sales. BrewGroup was bought in 2017 by Dutch company Jacobs Douwe Egberts (JDE) for over $100 million.

== Brands ==
- Amber Tips (bought 1963)
- Burton's
- Edgelets
- Gravity Coffee
- Hummingbird Coffee (bought 2016)
- Jed's Coffee
- Jura and La Cimbali
- Native Infusions
- NZ Live
- Tiger Tea (bought 1969)
- Twinnings
