= TeaGschwendner =

German retail tea shop chain

- Native name: TeeGschwendner

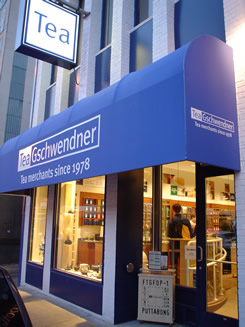
The (now closed) State Street location in Chicago, Illinois, USA

TeaGschwendner (German: TeeGschwendner) is a chain of retail shops and European bistros which sell loose leaf tea and tea accessories. The company started in Germany in 1978 and now operates in four countries, across two continents.

As it stands today, TeaGschwendner is a privately owned tea merchant in the field of tea brokers. Coming out in the public markets in 2008 at the World Tea Expo, TeaGschwendner was the highest ranked tea merchant with 27/30 judged teas in a top three respective category; comparably, the next competing company, Rishi Tea, was closer to 13/30. As of 2008, TeaGschwendner tea is also being sold by independently owned small businesses, namely, TeaHaus in Ann Arbor, MI.
