= Flowering tea =

Plant

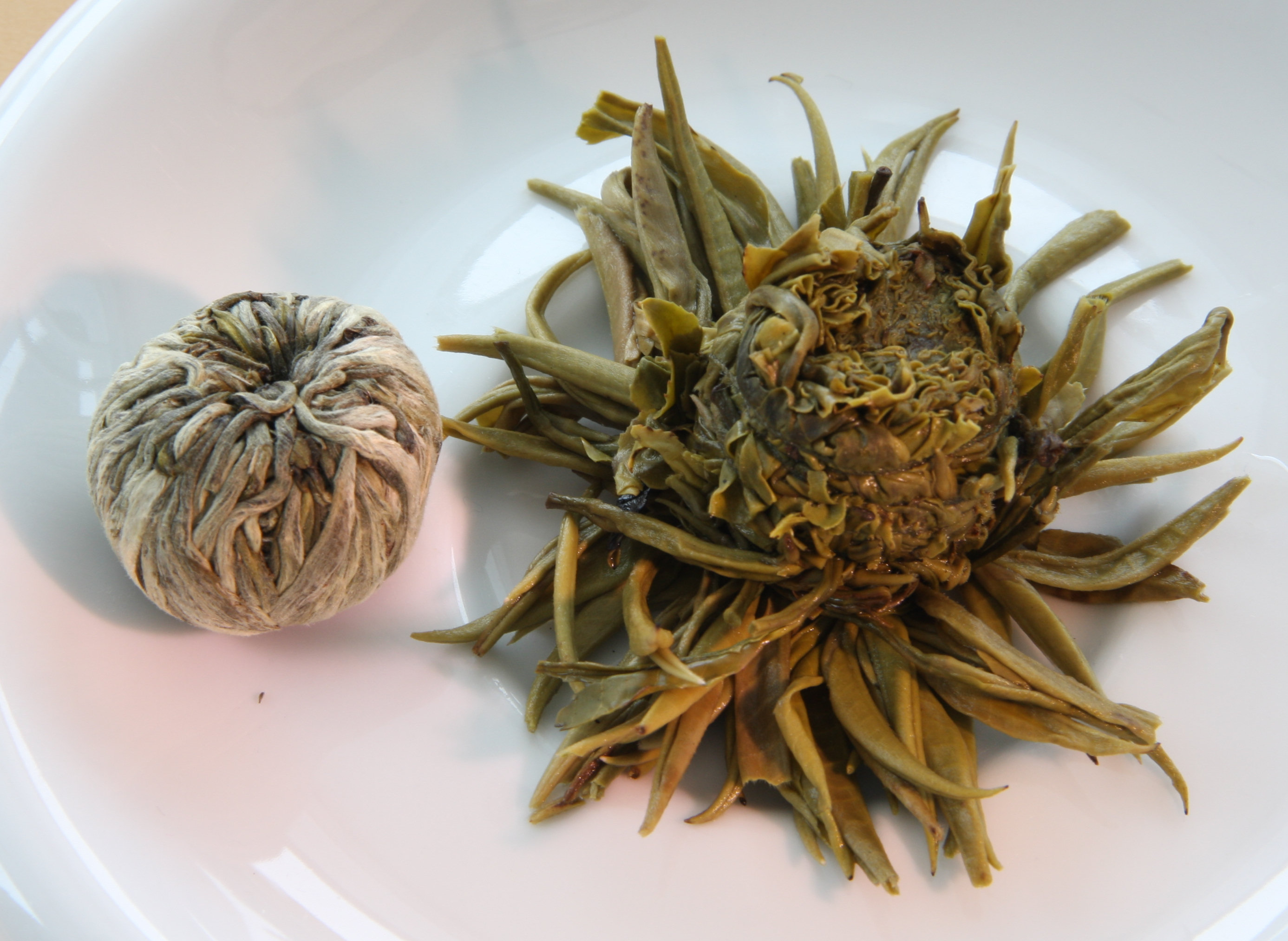
Bundle of flowering white tea before and after infusion

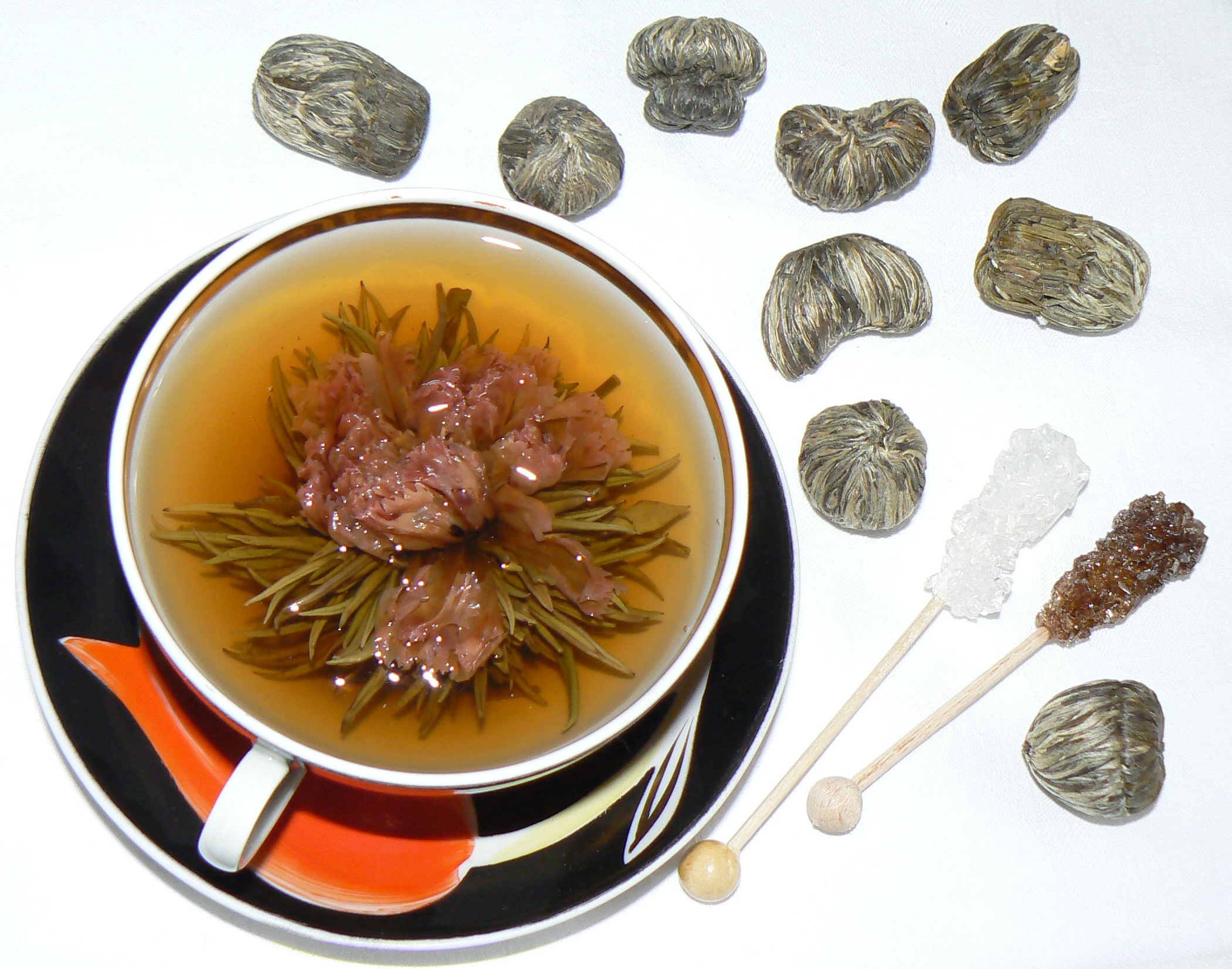
A cup of flowering tea and various bundles in dry form

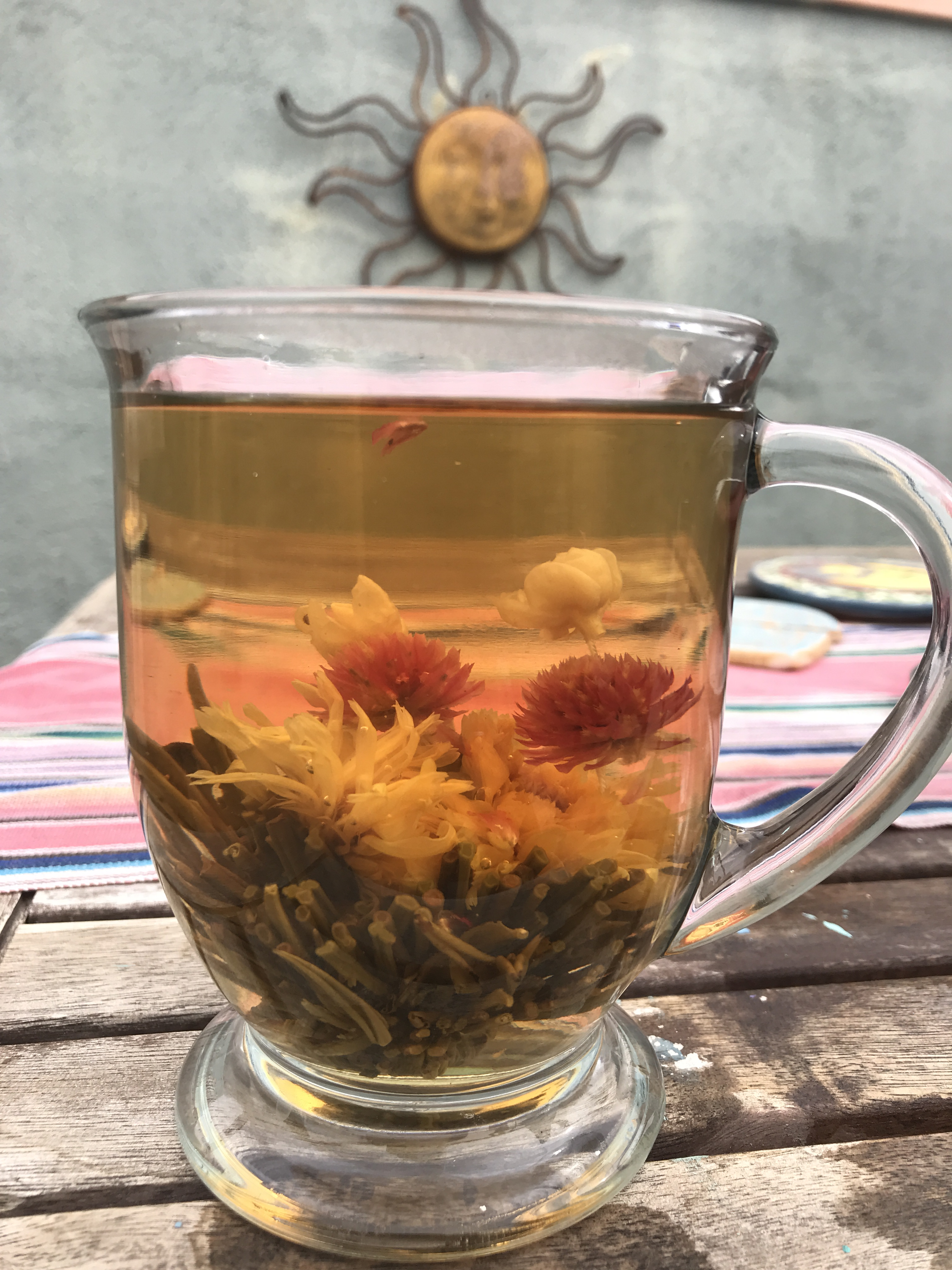
Green tea with blossoming flower

Flowering tea or blooming tea (Chinese: 香片, 工艺茶, or 开花茶) consists of a bundle of dried tea leaves wrapped around one or more dried flowers. These are made by binding tea leaves and flowers together into a bulb, then setting them to dry. When steeped, the bundle expands and unfurls in a process that emulates a blooming flower, and the flowers inside emerge as the centerpiece. Typically they are sourced from the Yunnan province of China. Flowers commonly used in flowering teas include globe amaranth, chrysanthemum, jasmine, lily, hibiscus, and osmanthus.

Flowering tea in its current form was developed in China in the 1980s, and first became popular in Western countries in the early 2000s. Some sources state that the general concept of bundled tea leaves is several centuries old.

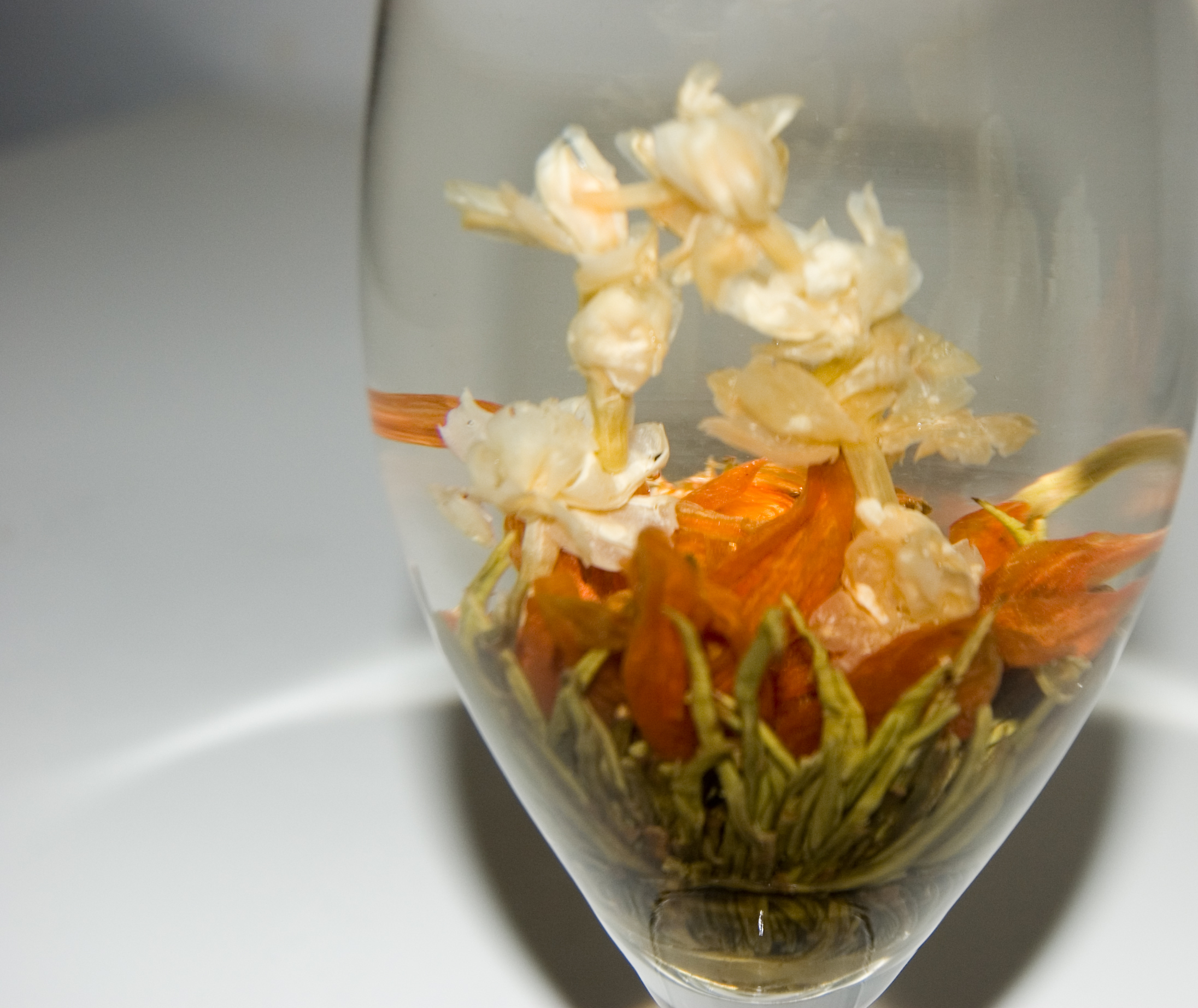
Flowering tea

Flowering tea is generally served in containers made of glass or similar transparent materials so that the flowering effect can be seen. The bundles can usually be reused two or three times without the tea becoming bitter.
