= List of teahouses =

Beautiful tea houses

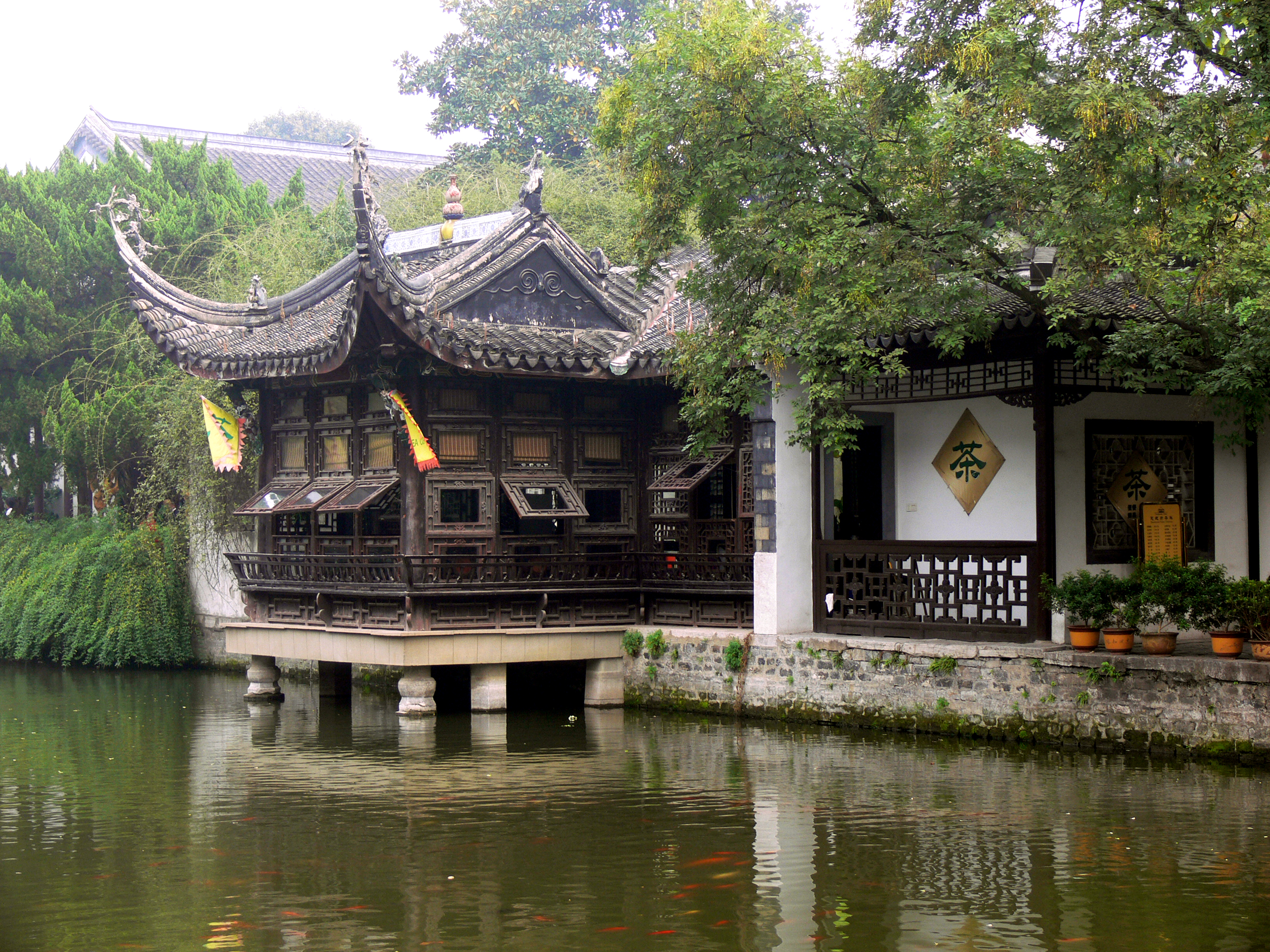
A teahouse in the Nanjing Presidential Palace garden, China

This is a list of teahouses. A teahouse is an establishment which primarily serves tea and other light refreshments. Sometimes the meal is also called "tea". Although its function varies widely depending on the culture, teahouses often serve as centers of social interaction, like coffeehouses. Some cultures have a variety of distinct tea-centered houses of different types that all qualify under the English language term "teahouse" or "tearoom". For example, the British or American tearoom serves afternoon tea with a variety of small cakes.

== Europe ==
- Blauwe Theehuis, Amsterdam
- Délifrance, French bakery chain
- Dobrá čajovna, Czech-based international chain
- TeaGschwendner, Germany-based international chain of retail shops and bistros
- Fourth Wave, Belgium-based specialty tea bar

=== Britain ===
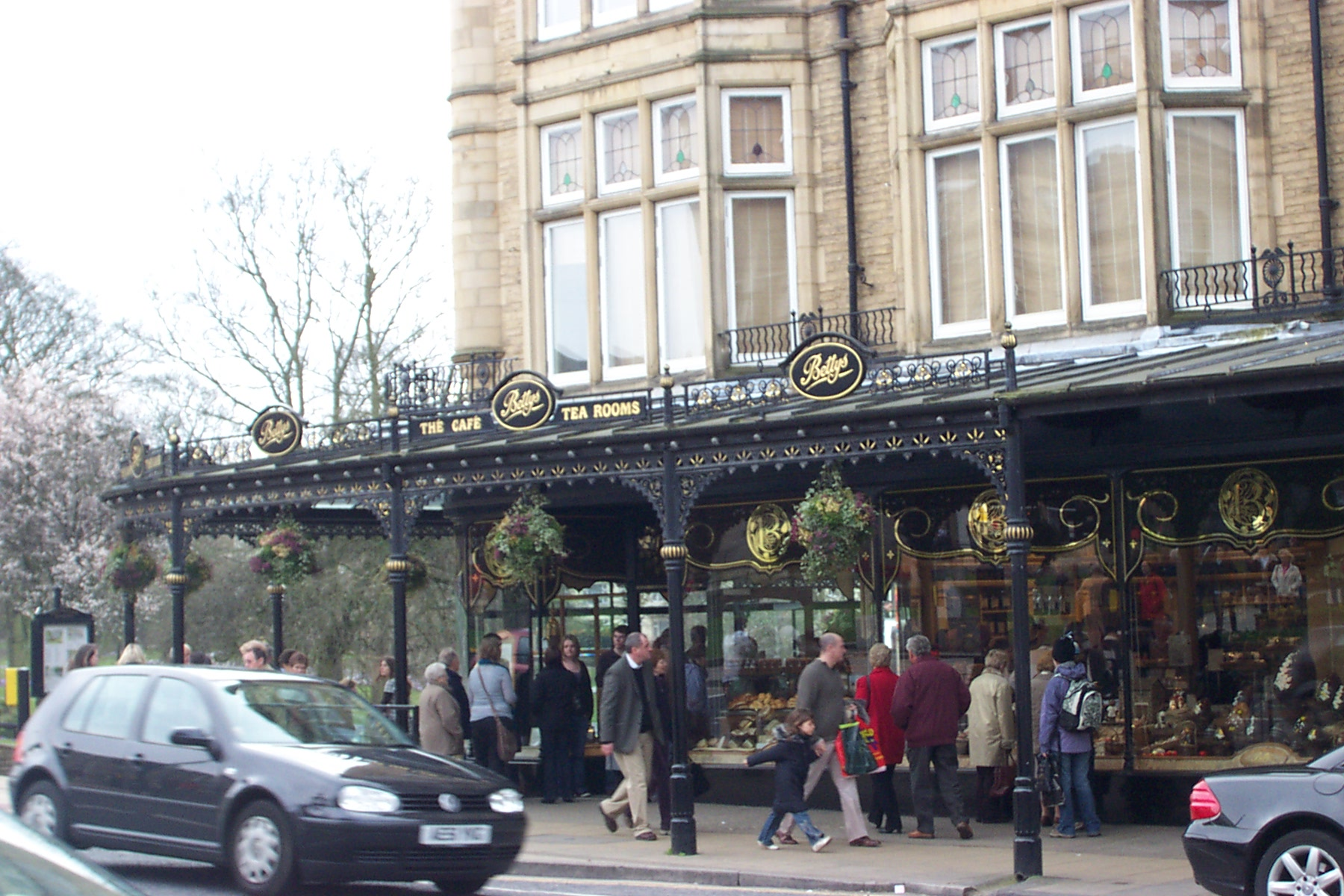
Bettys and Taylors of Harrogate

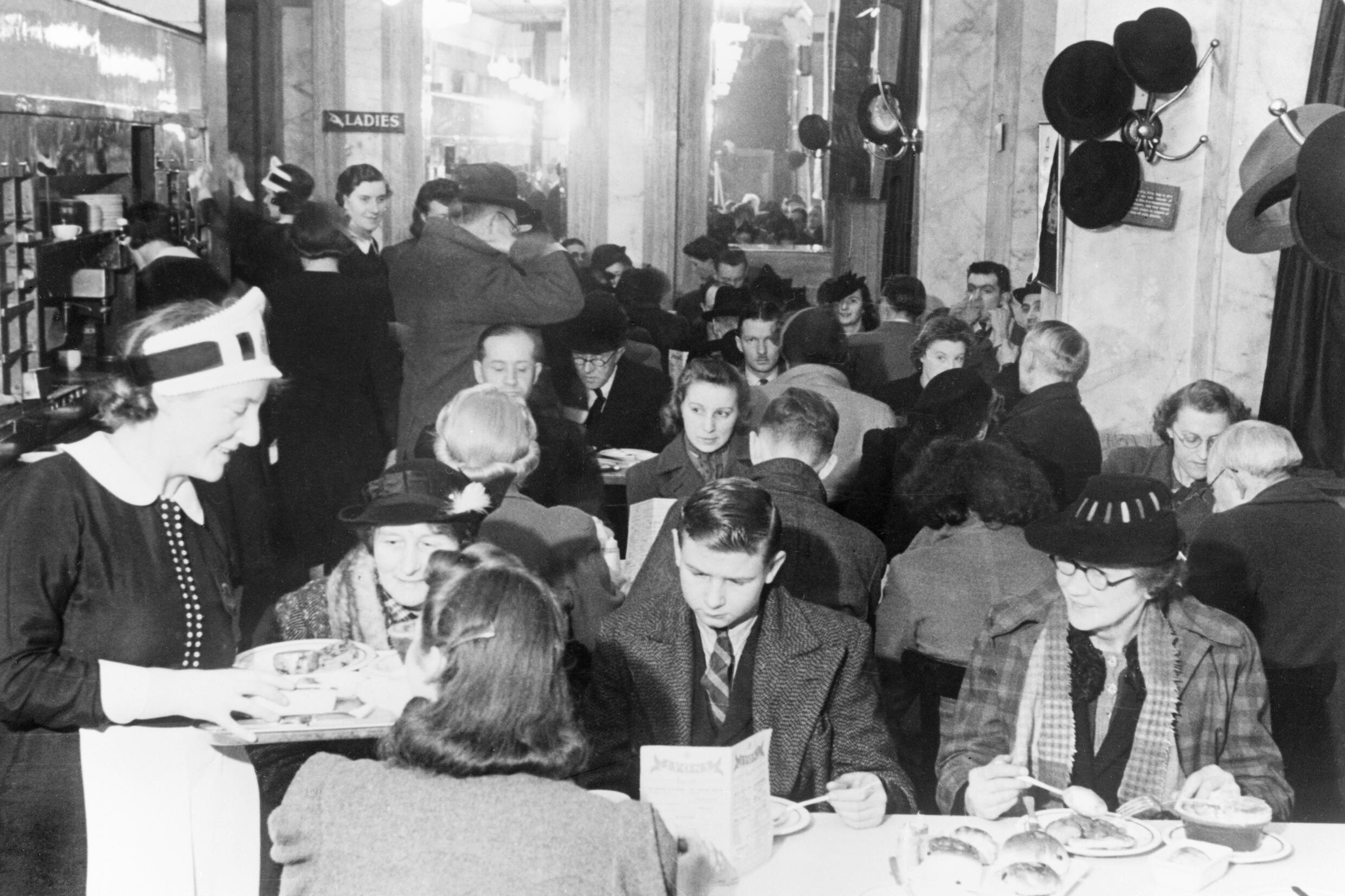
Customers enjoying afternoon tea at Lyon's Corner House on Coventry Street, London, 1942

- ABC tea shops, now defunct
- Bettys and Taylors of Harrogate, chain in Yorkshire
- Jacksons of Piccadilly, tea merchant
- Kardomah, a chain of tea and coffee shops in England, Wales, and a few in Paris, popular from the early 1900s until the 1960s, but now almost defunct.
- Lyons Corner House, now defunct; its waitresses were known as Nippy, because of their speed
- The Orchard, Grantchester, just outside Cambridge
- Tchai-Ovna, Glasgow music venue
- Willow Tearooms, Glasgow, founded 1903

=== Britain abroad ===
- Babington's tea room
- English Tea House and Restaurant, Malaysia

== The Americas ==
=== Canada ===
- Lake Agnes Tea House, Alberta
- Plain of Six Glaciers Tea House, Lake Louise, Alberta

=== United States ===
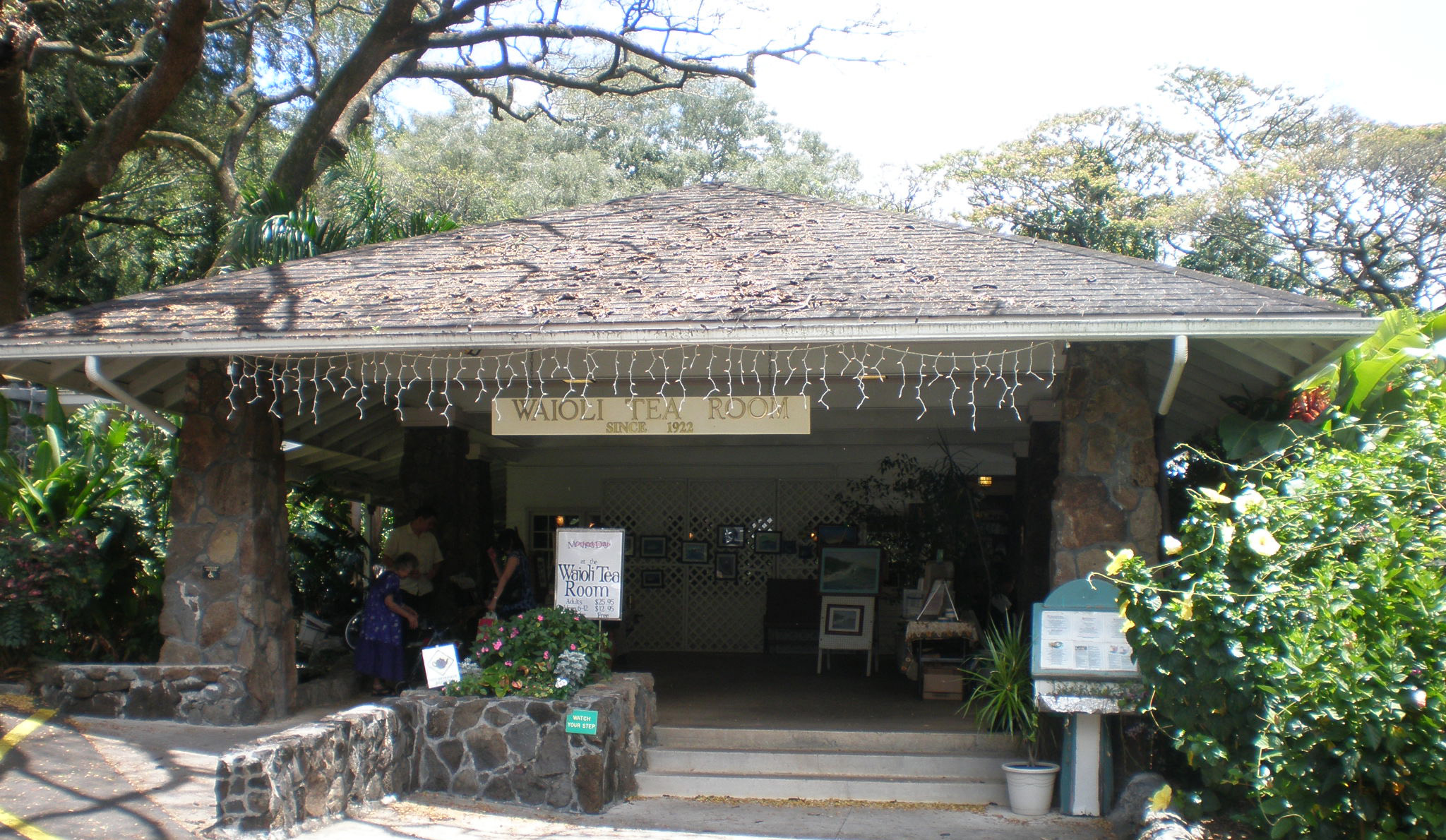
The Salvation Army Waiʻoli Tea Room in Honolulu, Hawaii, is listed in the U.S. National Register of Historic Places.

- Argo Tea, Chicago chain
- Gryphon, Savannah, Georgia
- Dushanbe Tea House
- Salvation Army Waiʻoli Tea Room, Hawai'i
- Shoseian Teahouse, California
- Tavalon Tea, New York tea merchant
- Tea and Sympathy, Manhattan, New York City
- Tealuxe, a chain

== Asia ==
=== India ===
- Brooke Bond Taj Mahal Tea House, Mumbai, India
- Chai Point, Bengaluru & New Delhi, India

=== China ===
- Cha chaan teng, common tea restaurants in Greater China
- Fuchun Teahouse, China
- Luk Yu, established in 1933 in Hong Kong
- Ten Fu Group, company

=== Japan ===
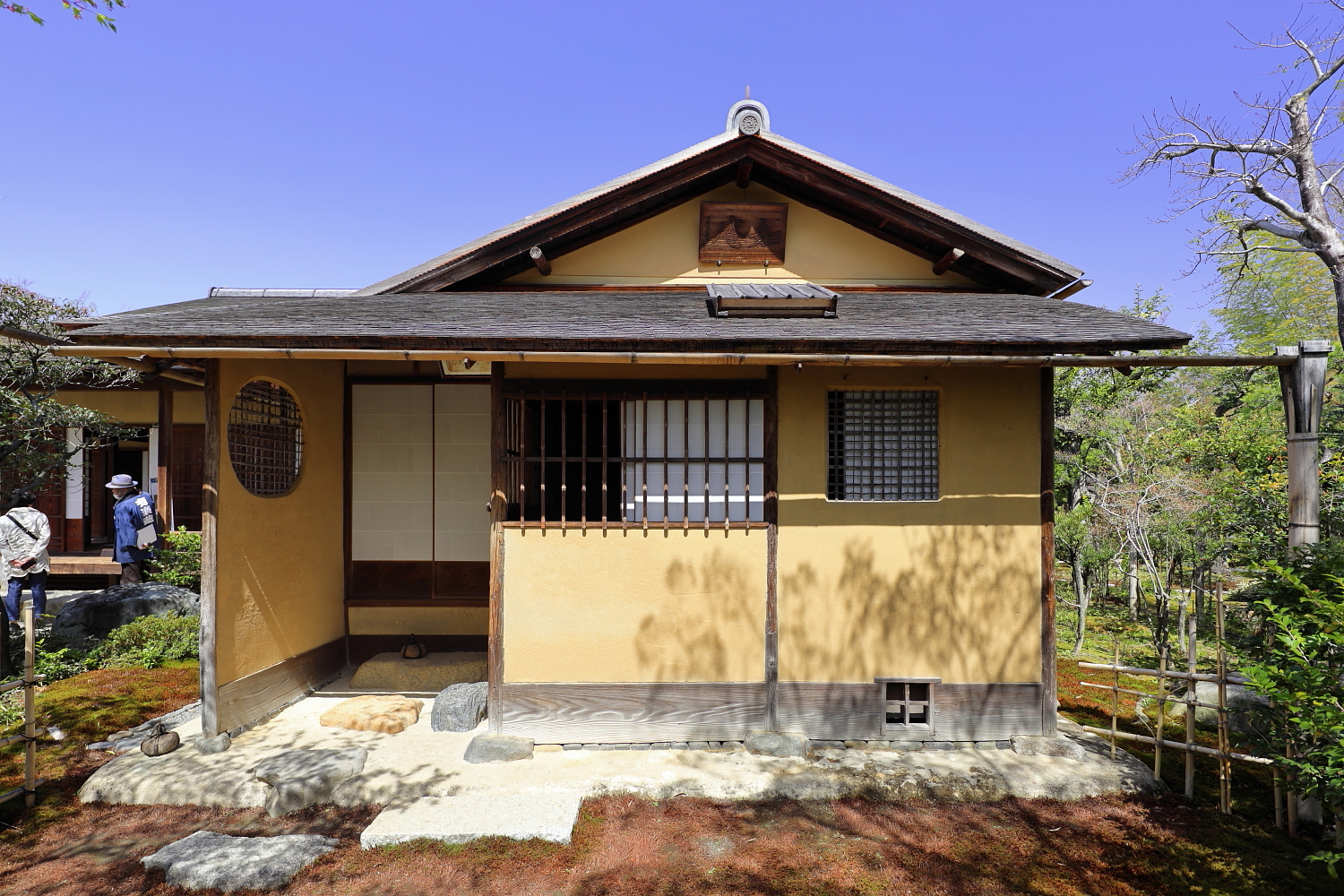
Jo-an tea house in Inuyama, a Japanese National Treasure

- Chashitsu, architectural spaces designed to be used for the Japanese tea ceremony
- Jo-an
- Tai-an
- Kakurin-tei
- Meimei-an
- Glass Tea House - KOU-AN, teahouse designed by Tokujin Yoshioka

=== Others ===
- Pak Tea House, Pakistan
- Wistaria Tea House, Taiwan

== See also ==
- Catherine Cranston
- List of bakery cafés
- List of bubble tea chains
- Thomas Ridgway
- Types of restaurant
