= Mount St. Piran =

Mountain in Banff NP, Alberta, Canada

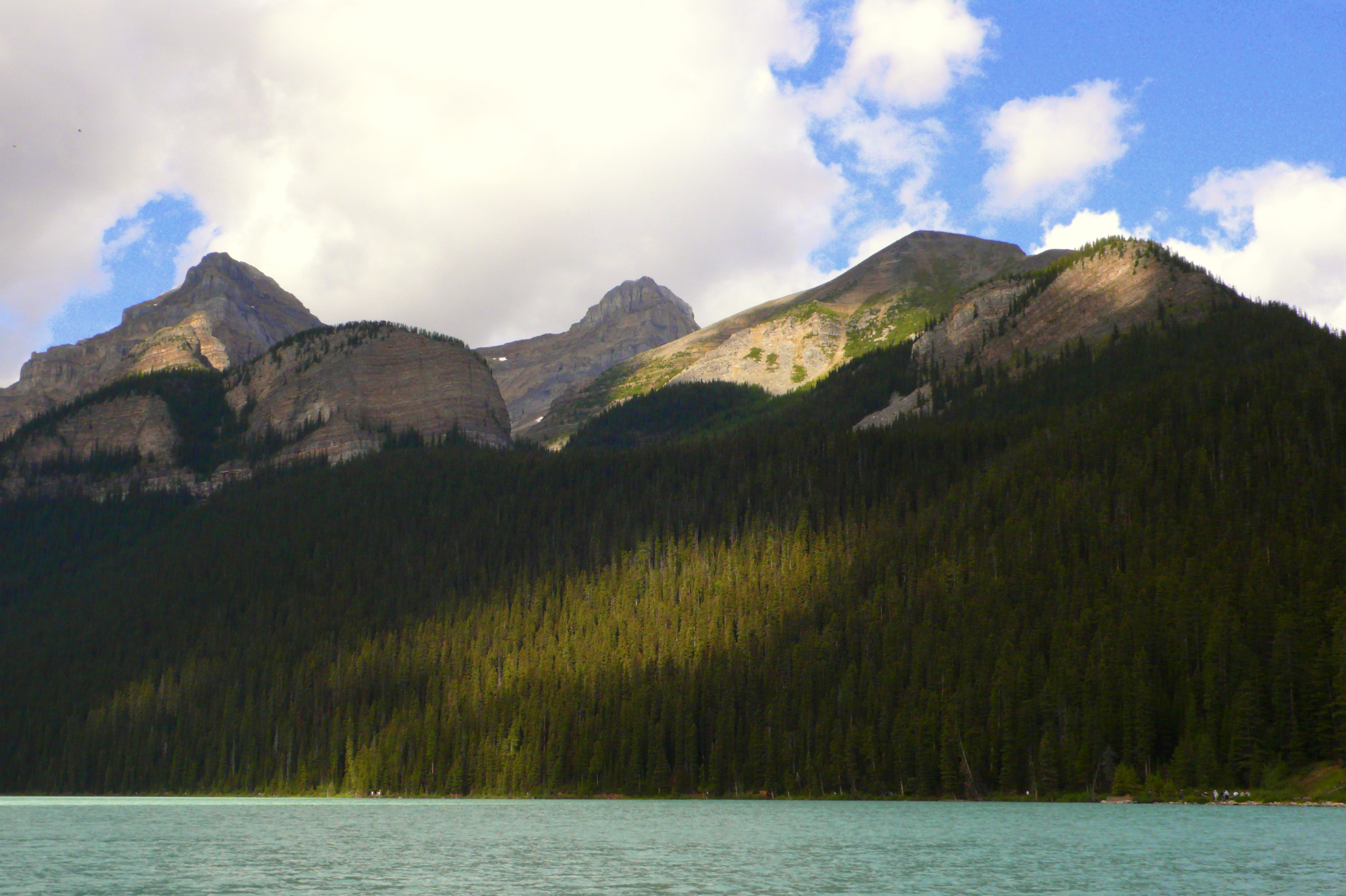
- The main summit is on the right

Highest point
- Elevation: 2,649 m (8,691 ft)
- Prominence: 187 m (614 ft)
- Listing: Mountains of Alberta
- Coordinates: 51°25′17″N 116°15′10″W

Geography
- Location within Alberta
- Country: Canada
- Provinces: Alberta
- Protected area: Banff National Park
- Parent range: Bow Range (Canadian Rockies)
- Topo map: NTS 82N8 Lake Louise

Climbing
- Easiest route: Hiking Trail

Mount St. Piran is a mountain in Banff National Park near Lake Louise, Alberta, Canada.

Located in the Bow River Valley southeast of the Minewakun Lake Valley; northwest of Lake Agnes; between Lake Louise Valley and lower Bath Creek.

It was named in 1894 by Samuel E.S. Allen after Saint Piran, the Patron Saint of Cornwall.

The mountain can be climbed from the eastern side via a hiking trail that branches North off the trail to the Little Beehive. Alternatively, the mountain can be climbed on the SW side from slopes below the SE face of Mount Niblock. Going up one side and down the other completes a loop on the northern side of Lake Agnes.

== Nearby ==
- Elizabeth Parker hut
- Lake O'Hara
- Fairview Mountain
- Mount Niblock
