= English tea =

English tea may refer to:

- English breakfast tea, a strong blend of tea, typical of the English breakfast
- English Tea House and Restaurant, a tea house in Malaysia
- English Tea Time, a meal in the late afternoon typical of Britain
- Tea in the United Kingdom, the general cuisine and culture of tea in Britain
