= Tea and Sympathy =

Tea and Sympathy may refer to:

- Tea and Sympathy (play), a 1953 play by Robert Anderson
- Tea and Sympathy (film), a 1956 adaptation of the play directed by Vincente Minnelli
- "Tea and Sympathy", a song by Janis Ian from the album Between the Lines, 1975
- "Tea and Sympathy", a song by Jars of Clay from the album Much Afraid, 1997
- Tea & Sympathy (album), a 2005 album by Bernard Fanning
- Tea & Sympathy, a 2009 album by Billie Myers
- Tea and Sympathy (restaurant), a restaurant in Manhattan, New York City
