= Mount Whyte =

Mountain in Banff NP, Alberta, Canada

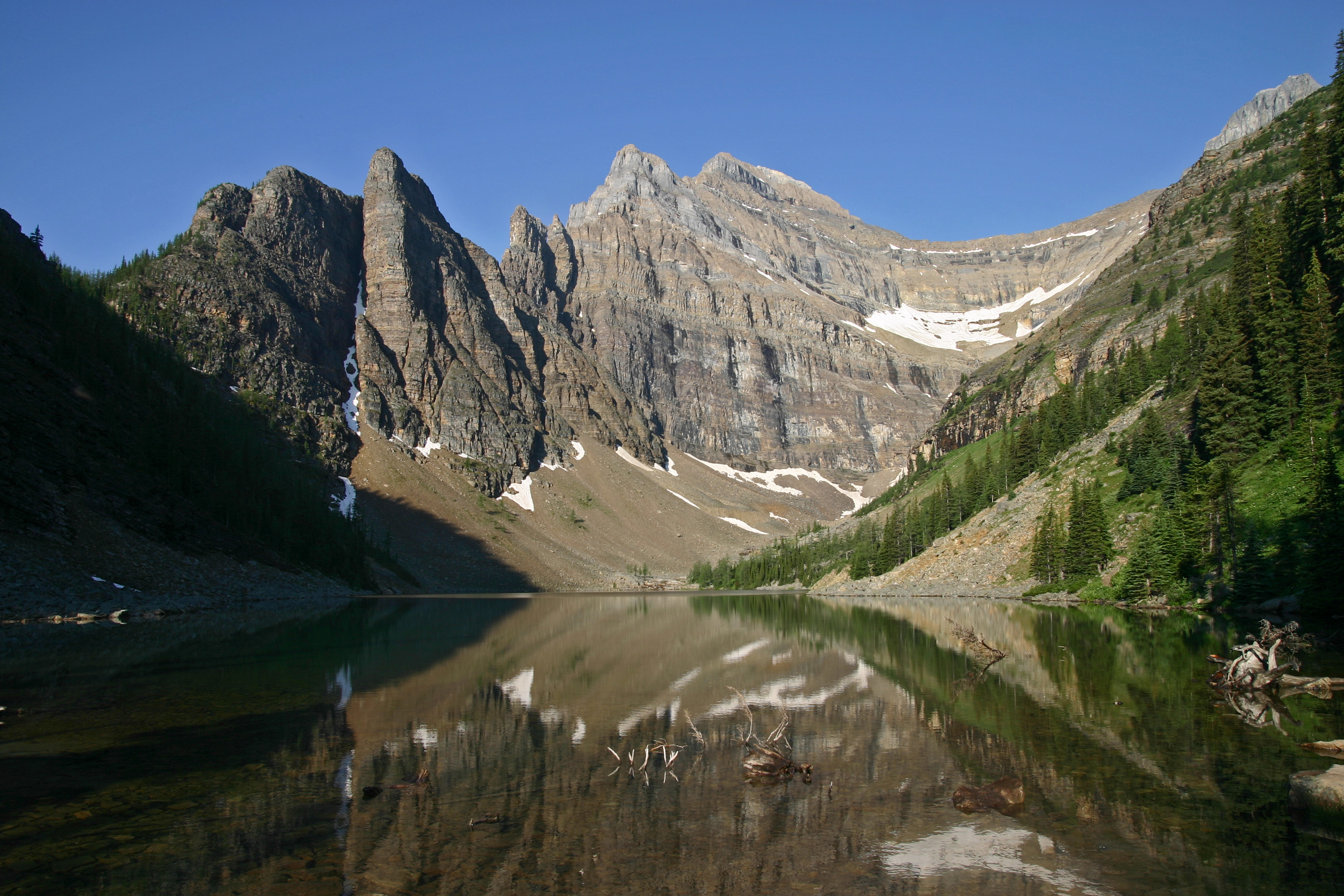
- Mt. Whyte at top centre, above Lake Agnes

Highest point
- Elevation: 2,983 m (9,787 ft)
- Prominence: 140 m (460 ft)
- Parent peak: Mount Victoria
- Listing: Mountains of Alberta
- Coordinates: 51°24′31″N 116°16′16″W

Geography
- Location within Alberta Location within Canada
- Interactive map of Mount Whyte
- Country: Canada
- Province: Alberta
- Protected area: Banff National Park
- Parent range: Bow Range
- Topo map: NTS 82N8 Lake Louise

Climbing
- First ascent: 1901
- Easiest route: Difficult scramble

Mount Whyte is a mountain in Alberta, Canada located in Banff National Park, near Lake Louise. The mountain can be seen from the Trans-Canada Highway, and offers views of the Valley of the Ten Peaks, including the Chateau Lake Louise. The mountain is also visible from the hiking trail that skirts the northern shore of Lake Agnes.

The mountain was named in 1898 by Sir William Methuen after William Whyte, a representative of the Canadian Pacific Railway.

== Climbing ==
Mt. Whyte is usually combined with Mount Niblock (2,976 m (9,764 ft)) when done as a scramble. However, while Mt. Niblock is rated a moderate scramble, Mt. Whyte is much more difficult due to additional exposure and loose rock. The scramble should not be attempted in snowy conditions due to considerable fall distance which would likely prove fatal.

For rock climbers, the Perren Route (II 5.6) is another option. While mostly a scramble as well, a short section of difficult climbing near the top in addition to route finding challenges and loose rock will not make it an easy ascent.

== Geology ==
Like other mountains in Banff Park, Mount Whyte is composed of sedimentary rock laid down during the Precambrian to Jurassic periods. Formed in shallow seas, this sedimentary rock was pushed east and over the top of younger rock during the Laramide orogeny.

== Climate ==
Based on the Köppen climate classification, Mount Whyte is located in a subarctic climate zone with cold, snowy winters, and mild summers. Winter temperatures can drop below -20 °C with wind chill factors below -30 °C.

== Gallery ==
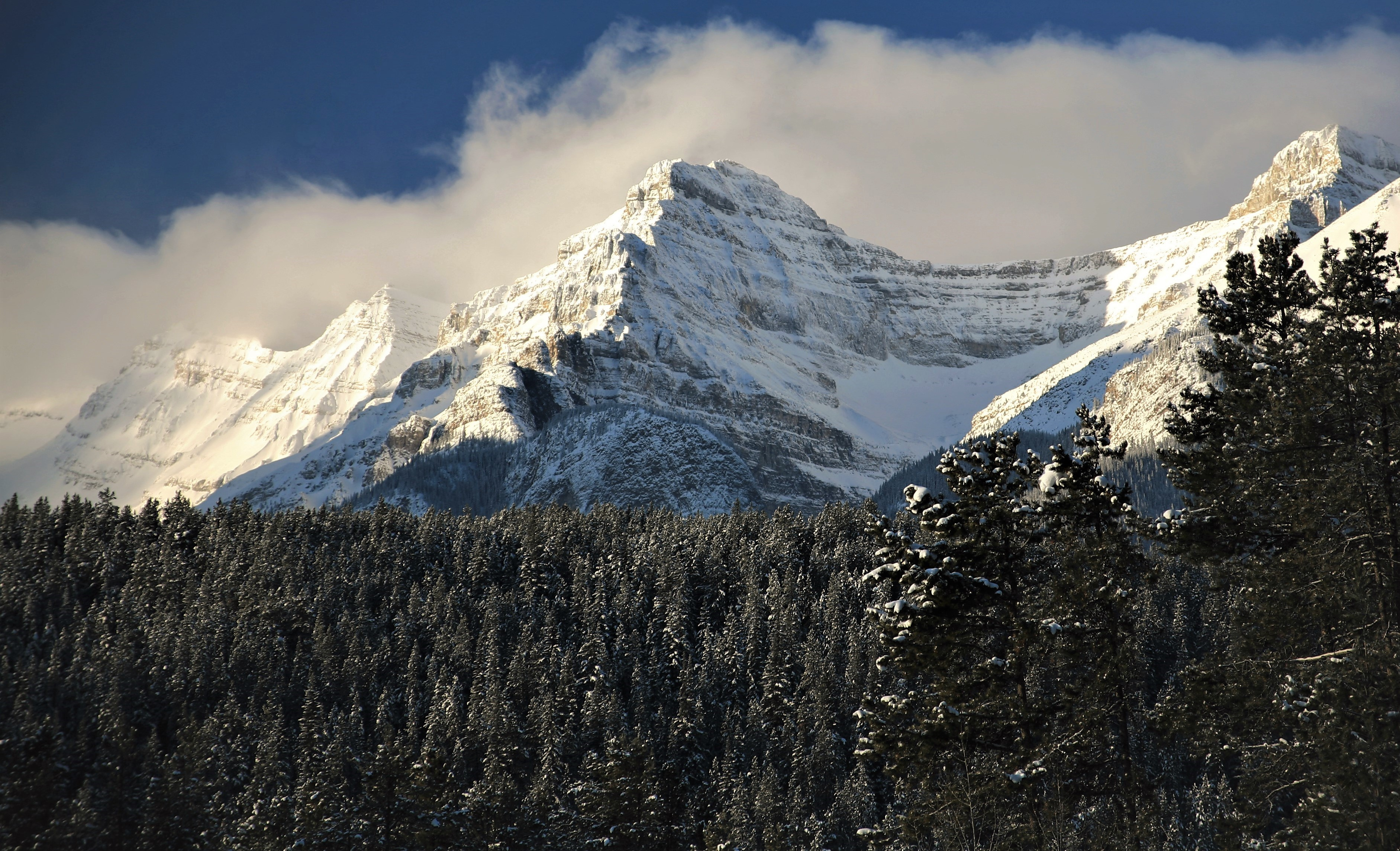
East aspect in winter

== See also ==
- Geography of Alberta
- Media related to Mount Whyte at Wikimedia Commons
- List of mountains in the Canadian Rockies
