= Mount Niblock =

Mountain in Banff NP, Canada

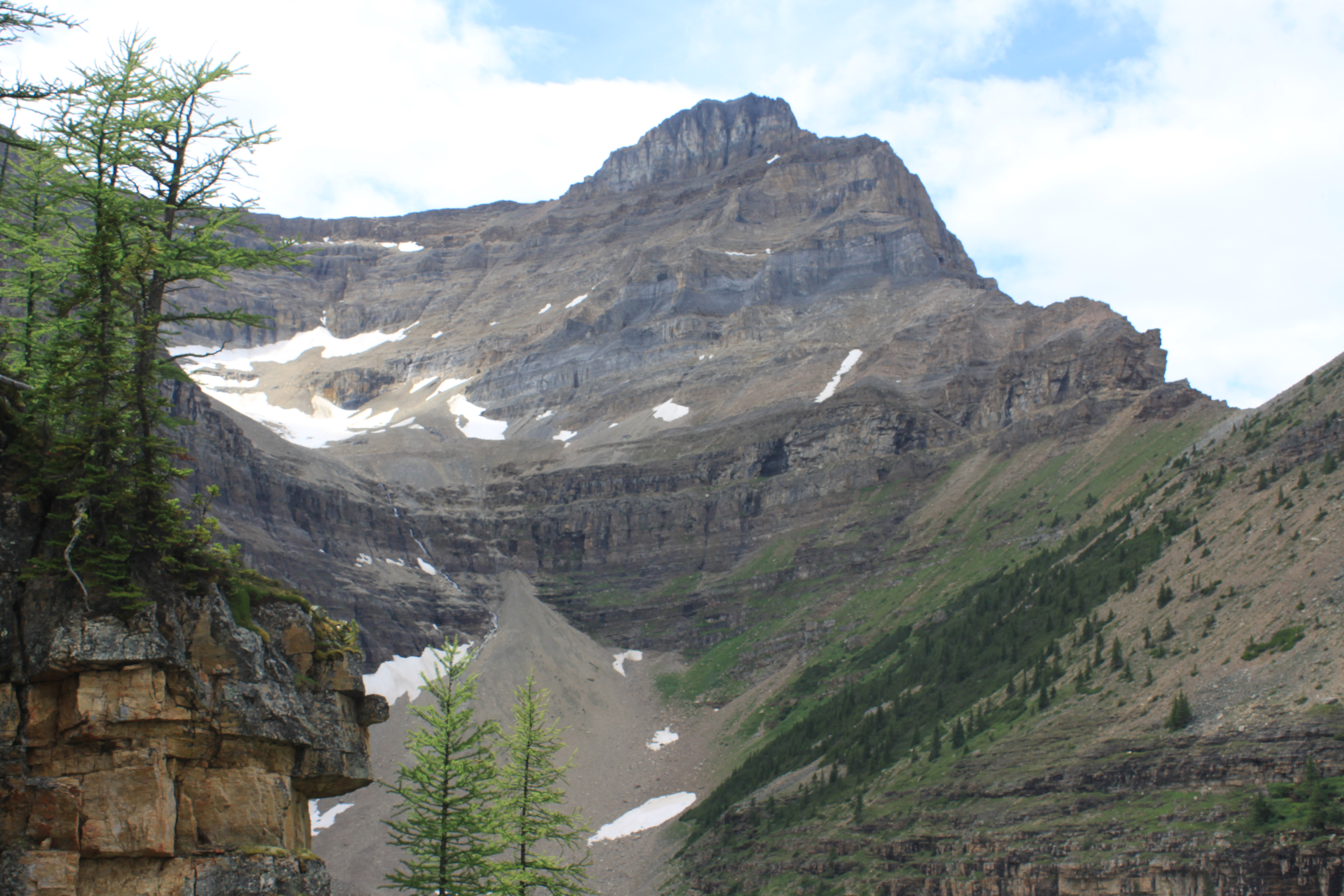
- Mount Niblock, August 2012

Highest point
- Elevation: 2,976 m (9,764 ft)
- Prominence: 142 m (466 ft)
- Listing: Mountains of Alberta
- Coordinates: 51°25′03″N 116°16′17″W

Geography
- Location within Alberta Location within Canada
- Interactive map of Mount Niblock
- Country: Canada
- Province: Alberta
- Parent range: Bow Range (Canadian Rockies)
- Topo map: NTS 82N8 Lake Louise

Climbing
- First ascent: 1899 by Walter Wilcox
- Easiest route: Moderate scramble

Mount Niblock is a mountain in Banff National Park near Lake Louise, Alberta, Canada.

The mountain was named in 1904 after John Niblock, a superintendent with the Canadian Pacific Railway. Niblock was an early promoter of tourism in the Rockies and influenced the naming of some of the CPR stops in Western Canada.

Mt. Niblock is a popular scramble in the Lake Louise area and is sometimes combined in the same day with Mount Whyte (2,983 m (9,787 ft)), although the latter is a more difficult scramble. The best time for climbing Mt. Niblock is July through September when the normal route is usually free of snow. Attempting it in the spring or early summer may include significant avalanche hazard.

To access Mt. Niblock, follow the trail as it begins near Chateau Lake Louise, passes Mirror Lake and then Lake Agnes. Follow the right hand shore line trail to the far end of the lake until it begins its left turn towards the Big Beehive. Here an obvious path can be found leading to the lower scree slopes and short cliffs. A more detailed route description can be found in Scrambles in the Canadian Rockies.

== Geology ==
Like other mountains in Banff Park, Mount Niblock is composed of sedimentary rock laid down during the Precambrian to Jurassic periods. Formed in shallow seas, this sedimentary rock was pushed east and over the top of younger rock during the Laramide orogeny.

== Climate ==
Based on the Köppen climate classification, this mountain is located in a subarctic climate with cold, snowy winters, and mild summers. Temperatures can drop below −20 °C with wind chill factors below −30 °C.

== Gallery ==
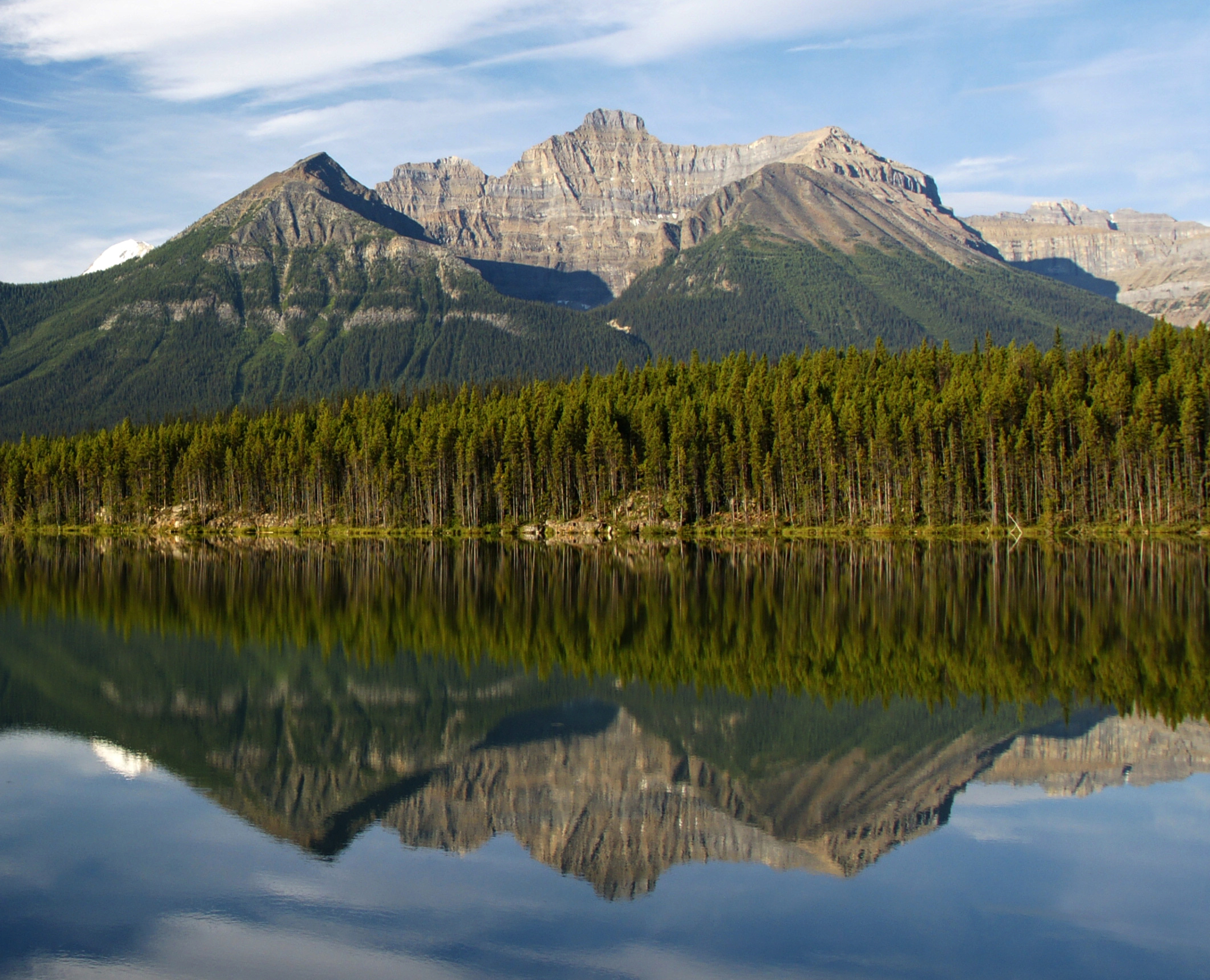
Mount Niblock reflected in Lake Herbert

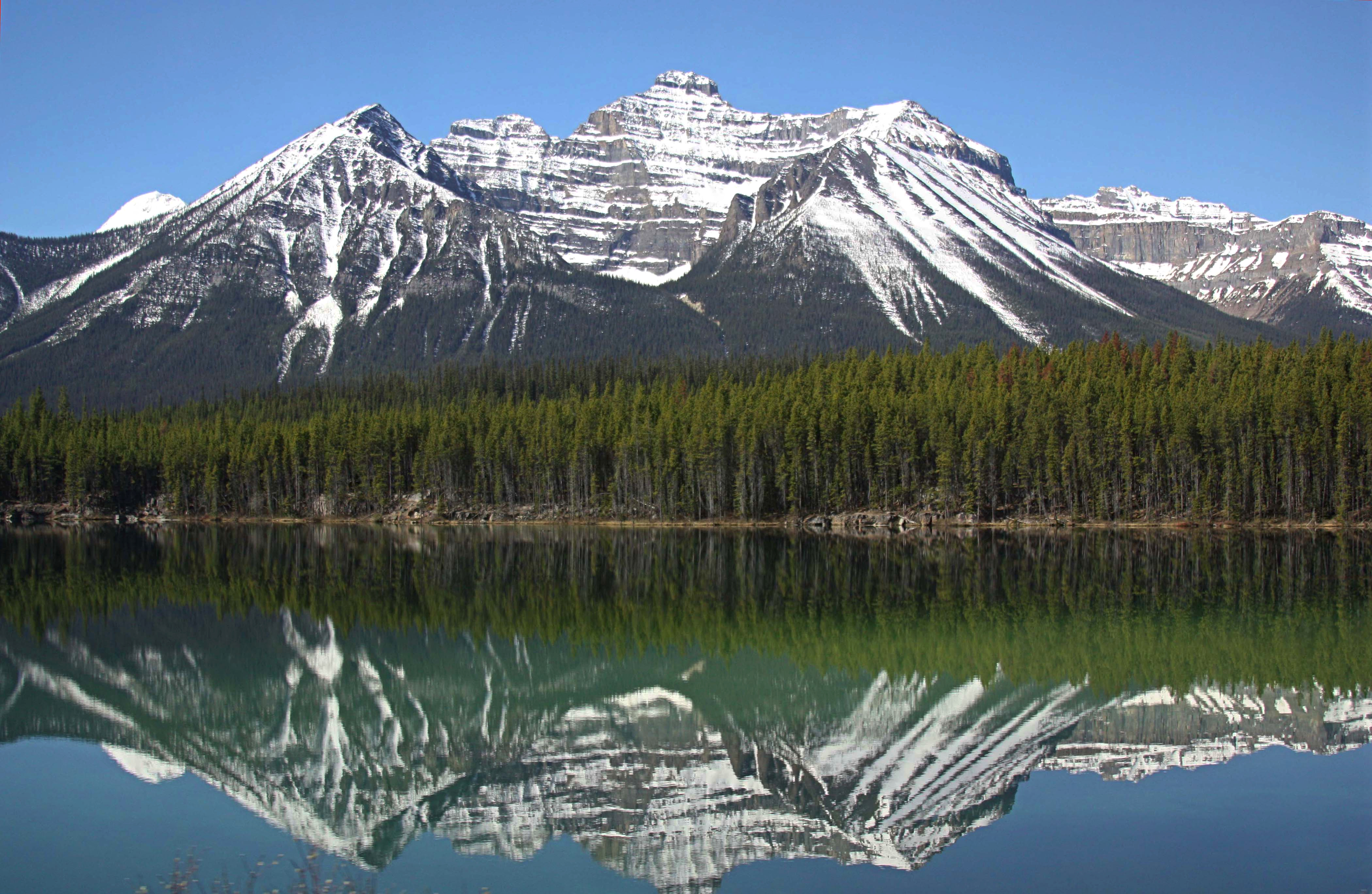
Mount Niblock reflected in Lake Herbert

== Nearby ==
- Fairview Mountain
- Mount St. Piran
