= Six Pack Band =

Indian pop music group

- Origin: Mumbai, India
- Genres: pop
- Years active: 2016-present
- Members: Fida Khan; Asha Jagtap; Ravina Jagtap; Chandni Suvarnakar; Komal Jagtap; Bhavika Patil

Six Pack Band is an Indian pop music group. The media has remarked that they are the first music group of all hijra performers, with "hijra" translated as "transgender".

The band members are Asha Jagtap, Komal Jagtap, Ravina Jagtap, Fida Khan, Bhavika Patil, and Chandni Suvarnakar. Each of them has shared biographical information about themselves.

India was in the midst of media attention and popular support for the repeal of Section 377 of the Indian Penal Code when the band formed in 2016.

When the band came to media attention they already had 5 music videos available online in YouTube.

Brooke Bond tea has featured the band in their advertisements.

In a 2020 episode the podcast De Taali-Life of a Transgender profiled the band.
