= Bettys and Taylors of Harrogate =

Family business based in Yorkshire, England

Bettys and Taylors Group Limited

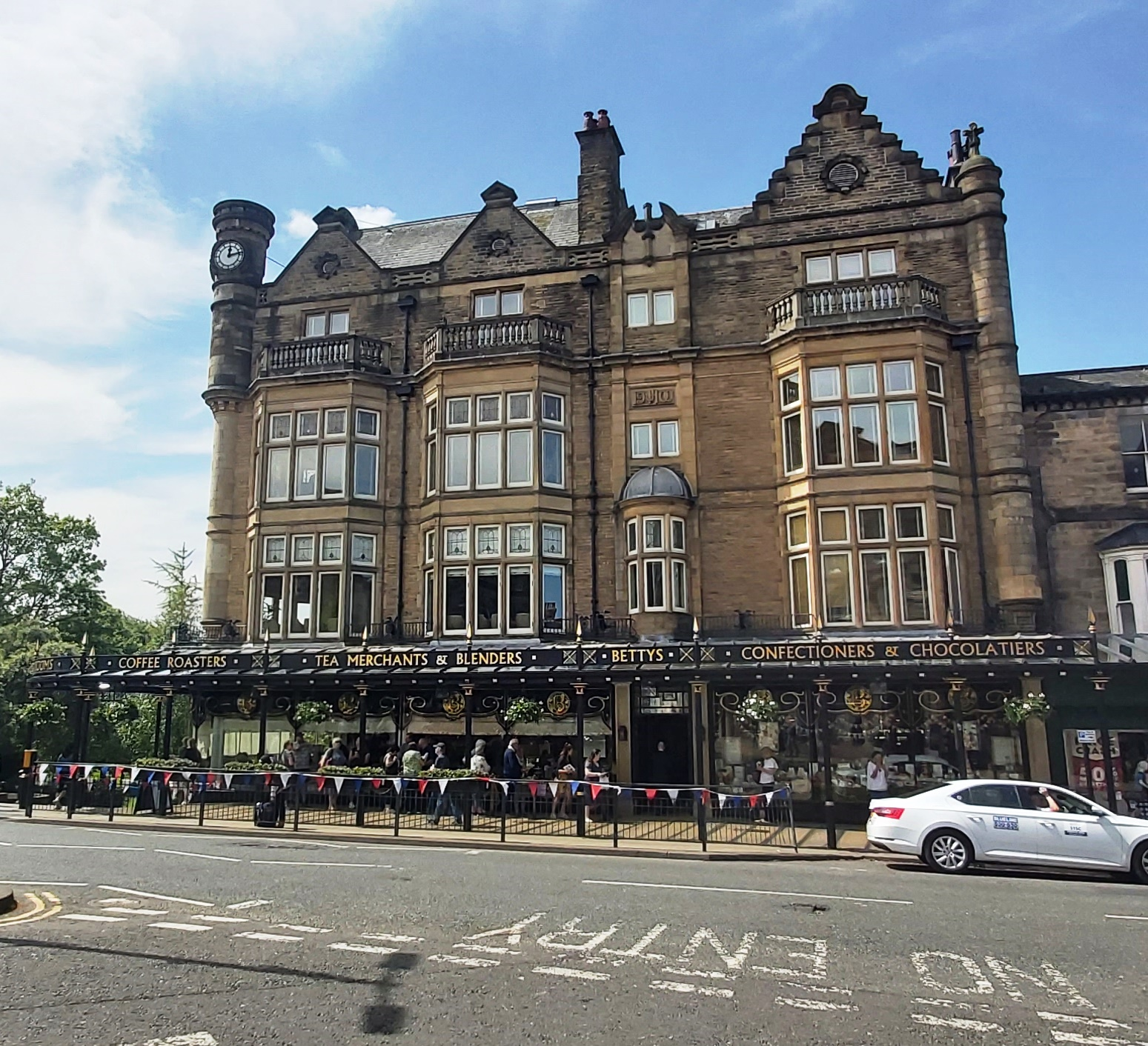
- Bettys Cafe Tearoom, Harrogate
- Type: Private
- Industry: Tea rooms; cafés; retail; tea; coffee; confectionery; bakery products
- Founded: Bettys and Taylors Group Ltd: 1962; Bettys: 1919; Taylors of Harrogate: 1886
- Founder: Charles Taylor (Taylors of Harrogate); Frederick Belmont (Bettys)
- Headquarters: Harrogate, England
- Key people: Clare Morrow (Chair of the Board); Andy Brown (Chair of the Collaborative CEO)
- Products: Yorkshire Tea; Taylors Coffee; Bettys Cafe Tea Rooms; Other products
- Revenue: £260.6 million (2022)
- Net income: £10.3 million (2022)
- Total assets: £138.7 million
- Owner: Frederick Belmont's family (fourth generation)
- Number of employees: 1,607 (2022)
- Subsidiaries: Bettys; Taylors of Harrogate; Bettys Tea Rooms
- Website: www.bettysandtaylors.co.uk

Bettys and Taylors of Harrogate is a family-owned company based in Harrogate in North Yorkshire, England, which is primarily known for the operation of tea rooms and sale of tea and coffee.

Taylors of Harrogate was founded in 1886 by Charles Edward Taylor and his brother and specialised in blending tea and coffee. The first Bettys Café Tea Room was opened in Harrogate by the Swiss confectioner Frederick Belmont in 1919, and in 1962 the company acquired Taylors. Yorkshire Tea, a black tea blend and one of the company's best-known products, was launched in 1977. Today, Bettys and Taylors Group interests include Yorkshire Tea, Taylors Coffee Merchants, Bettys Tea Rooms, Bettys Cookery School, and Bettys Confectionery. The group is currently chaired by Clare Morrow, a former journalist.

== History ==
The first Bettys tea room was opened in Harrogate, West Riding of Yorkshire, by Frederick Belmont, a Swiss confectioner, in 1919.

Belmont arrived in England at King's Cross railway station and boarded a train to Bradford, as much through luck as judgement, for he spoke very limited English and could not recall the address (or even the city) to which he was supposed to be heading. In 1922, Belmont opened a bakery in Harrogate, which made it possible to open more tea rooms, including branches in Bradford, Leeds, and York (the latter, the largest branch, opened in 1937).

The origin of the Bettys name is unknown. As of 2025 the company's website suggests three possibilities: Betty Rose, grand-daughter of the company chairman, who interrupted the first board meeting carrying a toy tea-tray; Betty Lupton, a former manager of the Harrogate Spa; or Betty, a 1914 musical with a "rags-to-riches" story.

The merger with Taylors of Harrogate (founded in 1886) occurred in 1962. The Yorkshire Tea brand was launched in 1977.

In 1986, Bettys by Post was developed, initially as a mail-order company, but it later moved online. In 2001, Bettys opened a cookery school on the same site as their craft bakery, at Plumpton Park near Harrogate.

Bettys marked its 90th anniversary in 2009 with an afternoon tea of patisseries, fancies, and cakes from the past, served by waitresses dressed in period costumes.

== Tea rooms ==
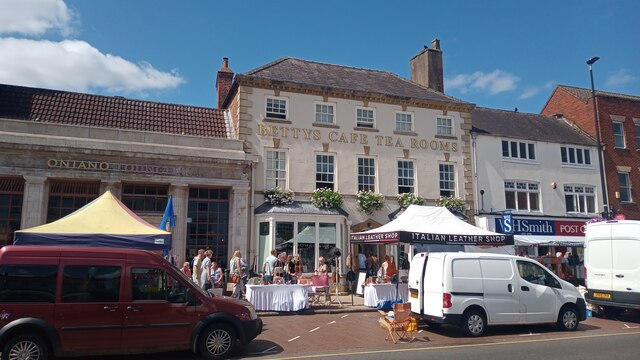
Bettys, Northallerton

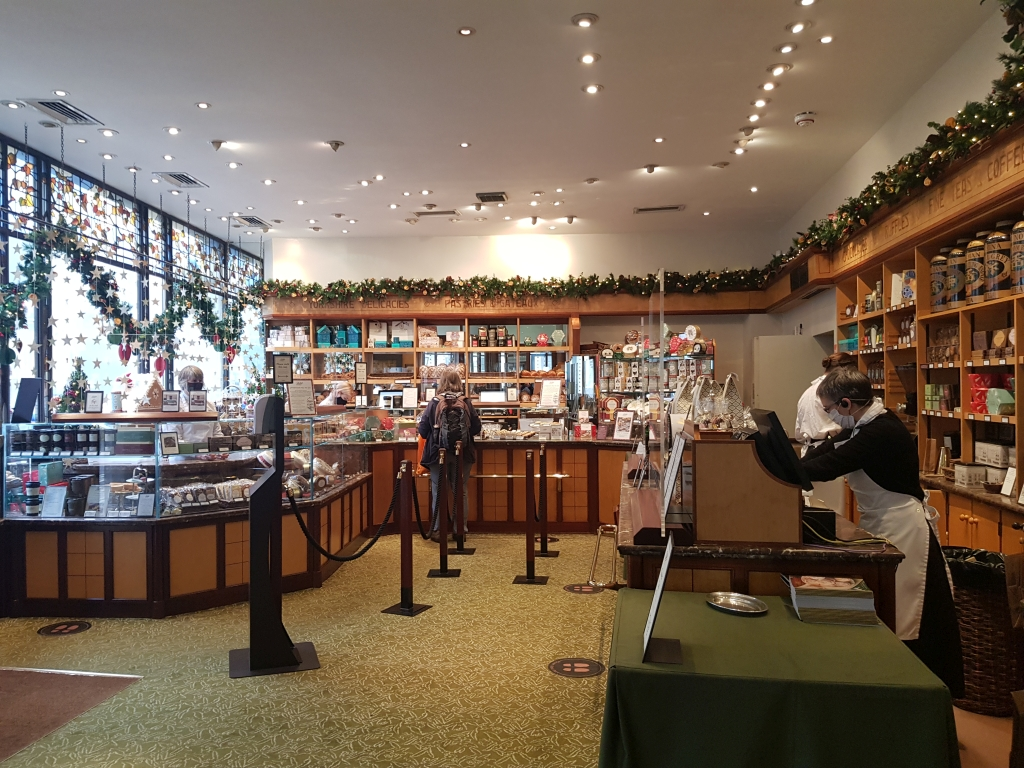
Bettys, York

There are five Bettys tea rooms, each of which includes a shop as well as a café. The locations of the tea rooms are:

- Bettys Harrogate – Parliament Street, Harrogate (opened 1976)
- Bettys York – St Helen's Square, York (opened 1937)
- Bettys Northallerton – High Street, Northallerton (opened 1971)
- Bettys Ilkley – The Grove, Ilkley (opened 1964)
- Bettys Harlow Carr – RHS Harlow Carr, Harrogate (opened 2004)

The St Helen's Square café in York was inspired by the RMS Queen Mary ocean liner and became particularly popular during World War II, when the basement "Bettys Bar" was frequented by American and Canadian "Bomber Boys" stationed around York. 'Bettys Mirror', on which many of them engraved their signatures with a diamond pen, remains on display at this branch.

In 1962, Bettys acquired Taylors of Harrogate, a family-owned business founded in 1886 known for its Yorkshire Tea and Taylors of Harrogate Coffee.

From 1930 until 1974, there was a Bettys tea room on Commercial Street, Leeds. There was also a tea room in Bradford, on Darley Street, which opened in 1922 and closed in 1974.

In 2021, the Bettys Stonegate café closed, although the shop remained open. The branch, which opened in 1965, was run by Taylors of Harrogate before becoming a Bettys in 1999 under the name Little Bettys. It was rebranded as Bettys Stonegate in 2011.

Bettys has consistently declined to open branches outside Yorkshire, citing a preference for maintaining close oversight of every detail.

== Publications ==
The Bettys name is associated with several books, primarily sold through the tea rooms:

- Hearts Tarts & Rascals, by Jonathan Wild
- A Year of Family Recipes, by Lesley Wild
- Who Was Betty?, by various contributors
- From the Alps to the Dales - A hundred Years of Bettys, by Annie Gray

== See also ==
- List of tea houses
