= Brooke Bond Taj Mahal Tea House =

- Interactive map of Brooke Bond Taj Mahal Tea House

Restaurant information
- Established: September 2015; 10 years ago
- Owner: Hindustan Unilever Limited
- Food type: Tea house
- Location: 36-A, Ground Floor, Sanatan Pereira Bungalow, St. John Baptist Road, Reclamation, Mount Mary, Bandra, West Mumbai, Maharashtra, 400050, India
- Website: tajmahalteahouse.com

The Brooke Bond Taj Mahal Tea House is a tea house and restaurant owned and operated by Hindustan Unilever Limited that is located in Bandra, West Mumbai, India. It opened for business in September 2015. The establishment is 3,500 square feet in size and seats around 80 patrons. It is Hindustan Unilever's first tea restaurant business. The establishment was designed by brothers Ayaz Basrai and Zameer Basrai, both from Bandra.

== Fare ==
The Brooke Bond Taj Mahal Tea House is associated with and serves Brooke Bond Taj Mahal and other tea products, totaling over 40 tea varieties. Teas served include milk teas, iced teas, chai and lattes, tea lemonades and tea smoothies. Teas are served with complementary shortcrust cookies and raisin and oat biscuits.

The foods were developed by French chef Gregory Bazire, with a focus upon complementing the teas. The restaurant has a tea-pairing menu that is always available, and also provides traditional tea service, breakfast, lunch and dinner menus and service. The tea house also provides tea tasting sessions. Dishes include waffles, Eggs Benedict, idli burgers, akuri, ragi dhokla, chicken dishes, tortellini, sandwiches, soups, salads and various desserts, among others.

== Entertainment ==
The tea house has hosted live music performances, such as a 14-hour concert of Indian classical music that occurred in February 2016. This concert was in commemoration of the 50th anniversary of Brooke Bond Taj Mahal Tea.

== See also ==
- List of tea houses
