= Arthur Brooke (entrepreneur) =

British businessman

Arthur Brooke (1845–1918) was the founder of the British tea company Brooke, Bond & Co. He established the business in 1869, which was so successful that he was making £5,000 a year by the age of 30 (the equivalent of roughly £741,957 in 2025), with shops and warehouses in several major British cities.

A statue of Arthur Brooke can be found in The Trafford Centre.

== Early life ==
Arthur Brooke was born on 30 November 1845 in Ashton-under-Lyne, Manchester to tea wholesaler Charles Brooke and Jane née Howard. He had a short career in the textile industry, before getting terminated due to the cotton famine in 1864. After completing an apprenticeship at the Peek Brothers and Winch tea company in Liverpool, he was transferred to the company's head office in London, before later deciding to return home to help his father revive his wholesale tea business, establishing new outlets in Lancashire.

== Brooke Bond & Co. ==
In 1869 Brooke opened his first shop under the business name Brooke Bond & Company at 29 Market Street, Manchester where he sold tea, coffee and sugar. He added the name Bond because he liked the sound of it, hence the name stayed.

Brooke developed and blended his products and sold them in ½ lb and 1lb paper bags. He offered precise mixtures of premium blends of tea and did not go with the marketing trends of the day, so customers could buy consistent flavours from week to week. Each bag was signed with the company name to avoid counterfeiting. Brooke delivered his products in his own transport to make sure they reached his customers regularly and always fresh, promising good quality products as the company's goal. One of Brooke's early slogans was "Good tea unites good company, exhilarates the spirits, opens the heart, banishes restraint from conversation and promotes the happiest purposes of social intercourse" which indicated his adeptness for good advertising.

In the early 1870s Brooke opened a warehouse in a London and shops in Liverpool, Leeds, London, Bradford and a few stores in Scotland. The company headquarters were established in 1872 at 129 Whitechapel High Street in London. When the British trade industries were hit by the long depression, Brooke Bond was forced to close their stores in London and Scotland. Arthur Brooke had considered moving to New Zealand, before deciding to sell his products to wholesale grocers. While this helped in further expanding the business, Brooke Bond ceased to hand-deliver their packets of tea directly to customers.

The business expanded to the Indian market as Brooke Bond Red Label in 1903, where the brand remains popular to this day.

Arthur Brooke remained the chairperson of Brooke Bond & Co., before retiring in 1910. His son Gerald Brooke took over the business as chairperson, later purchasing a new warehouse on Whitehorse Street, Leeds and a signing a sixty-eight-year lease on St. Dunstan's Hill, London, the registered office of the company.

== Personal life ==
Brooke married Alice Young, the daughter of naval officer William Young, in 1875. They first lived in Stonebridge Park, Willesden before moving to Bedford park, Kensington and later buying a country house near Dorking. The couple had four children: Gerald, Justin, Neville, and Rupert, and two known grandchildren, John and David, who were all involved in the company. Brooke also had a younger sister named Agnes Bushell (née Brooke), who went on to marry Alfred Thomas Bushell, a former employee in Brooke's Liverpool shop. Bushell later emigrated to Australia and founded the Bushells Tea Company. Brooke died on 13 April 1918 in Dorking of acute tuberculosis and pneumonia. A Blue Plaque was donated in his honour by Brooke Bond & Co in 1966, and adorns his birthplace at 6 George Street, Ashton-under-Lyne.
