= Yorkshire Tea =

Black tea blend

- Product type: Tea
- Current owner: Bettys & Taylors Group
- Produced by: Taylors of Harrogate
- Country: England
- Introduced: 1977
- Tagline: "Where everything's done proper" "Let's have a proper brew"
- Website: yorkshiretea.co.uk

Yorkshire Tea is a black tea blend produced by the Bettys & Taylors Group since 1977. It became the best-selling tea brand in Britain in 2019. Charles Edward Taylor founded CE Taylor & Co. in 1886, later shortened to "Taylors". The company was purchased by 'Betty's Tea Rooms' in 1962, which today forms the Bettys & Taylors Group. Taylors of Harrogate is based in Harrogate, Yorkshire, in the first Betty's tea room.

The group is owned by the family of Bettys' Swiss founder, Fredrick Belmont, and is currently chaired by Lesley Wild. The company is one of the few remaining family tea and coffee merchants in the country, whilst competing with the British-owned PG Tips (Lipton Teas and Infusions) and Tetley (Tata), where Yorkshire Tea is now the most purchased tea brand in the UK, overtaking Twinings (a division of Associated British Foods) and Typhoo.

== Products ==
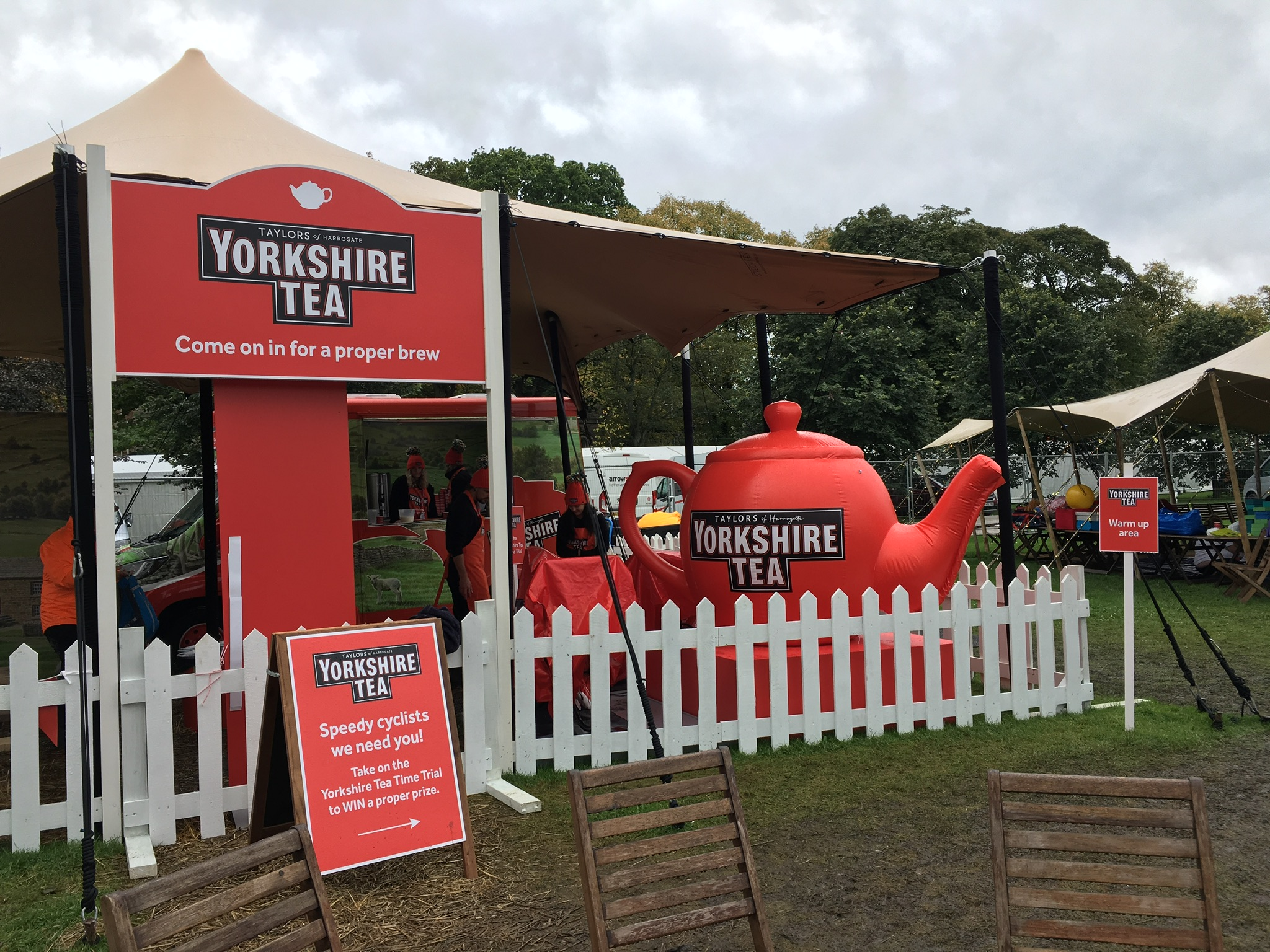
Yorkshire Tea area at the Stray Harrogate

Yorkshire Tea uses varieties of tea grown in India, Sri Lanka, and Kenya, blended to form nine blends: Yorkshire Tea, Yorkshire Decaf, Yorkshire Hardwater (available in the United Kingdom), Yorkshire Gold, Breakfast Brew, Bedtime Brew, Biscuit Brew, Caramelised Biscuit Brew and Toast and Jam Brew.

In 2016 the brand launched Breakfast Brew, Breaktime Brew and the decaffeinated Bedtime Brew. Yorkshire Tea introduced Biscuit Brew, a malty flavoured tea, to its range in 2018, Toast and Jam Brew in 2020 and Caramelised Biscuit Brew in 2024. Toast and Jam Brew was discontinued in 2024.

In June 2025, due to the growing interest in iced tea, Yorkshire Tea put out a trial launch of Yorkshire Tea Iced. The drink is made from a mixture of Yorkshire Gold blend, with a choice of either a flavour of lemon or peach & raspberry. In May 2026, Yorkshire Tea officially launched by offering its iced teas in cans in branches of Amazon and Sainsbury's. As well as offering it separately, it is also part of a lunch meal deal.

== History ==
Charles Edward Taylor and his brother created their company, CE Taylor & Co., in 1886 which was later shortened to "Taylor's". The brothers later opened "Tea Kiosks" in the Yorkshire towns of Harrogate and Ilkley, and in 1962, local tea room competitor Betty's took over Taylor's, renamed it 'Taylors of Harrogate' and formed the Bettys & Taylors Group, which is owned by the family of Fredrick Belmont, who founded 'Bettys Tea Rooms'. The Group now uses the 'Bettys' and 'Taylors' brands in a number of industries including Yorkshire Tea and Taylors Coffee Merchants under the 'Taylors of Harrogate' name and Bettys Tea Rooms, Bettys Cookery School and Bettys Confectionery under the 'Bettys' brand.

Yorkshire Tea as a brand was launched in 1977, originally conceived as a "Yorkshire blend for Yorkshire people". In the early days different blends were created and sold for different regions of Yorkshire where the hardness / softness of the water varied. Over time, and as the scale of the brand grew to be fully national, the product has evolved to one single blend in the standard orange-coloured pack. However, it retains a hard water variant in green-coloured packs to cater for those who live in hard water areas of the UK.

When Safeway was taken over by West Yorkshire-based Morrisons in 2004, commentators in the London press noted the amount of shelf space in one former Safeway store that was suddenly given over to Yorkshire Tea.

In 2009, the Prince of Wales granted Yorkshire Tea a Royal Warrant. The company has also sponsored ITV1's Yorkshire-based Heartbeat from 1998 to 2001.

By 2015, Yorkshire Tea was the third best-selling tea brand in Britain behind Tetley and PG Tips. By September 2017, it was the second best-selling brand behind PG Tips after having overtaken Tetley on sales in the traditional "black tea" market. In November 2019, it was revealed that Yorkshire Tea was now the number one selling brand of tea in the United Kingdom with 28% of the traditional black tea market.

== Advertising and popular culture ==
In 2007, a new TV campaign was created using the line "Try It, You'll See", voiced by Bill Nighy. Starting in 2017, an advertising campaign featuring prominent Yorkshire celebrities in a version of the area for which they're known, such as Michael Parkinson conducting employment interviews, the Kaiser Chiefs playing "I Predict a Riot" as the hold music for incoming telephone calls and Sean Bean giving motivational speeches to workers.

Yorkshire Gold is mentioned in the popular Showtime TV series Homeland as a favourite of protagonist Sergeant Nicholas Brody. Ian Brabbin, tea buyer at Bettys and Taylors of Harrogate said:

We were both surprised and delighted to discover that Yorkshire Gold has been given such a starring role in Homeland and are looking forward to seeing the show when it arrives on our screens here later in the year. We are no strangers to the small screen – Yorkshire Tea has also made a cameo appearance on Friends, not to mention our ever growing band of celebrity fans such as Noel Gallagher and Alan Carr.

Also on the celebrity fan list are Russell Crowe, who posted on Twitter about the beverage in 2012, and who visited Yorkshire Tea's headquarters in Harrogate whilst touring with his band. Other aficionados include Martha Reeves, who was also featured on the social media site holding Yorkshire Tea paraphernalia, and Patrick Stewart who indicated Yorkshire Gold was his favourite tea during a Reddit Ask Me Anything session.

In 2013, Yorkshire Tea entered a sponsorship agreement with the England and Wales Cricket Board of the England cricket team until October 2015. As an official supporter of the Grand Départ of the 2014 Tour de France in Yorkshire, Yorkshire Tea produced a 30g special edition sample pack rebranded as Yorkshire Thé.

Margaret Ham, from Basingstoke, who turned 100 years-old on June 27, 2026, «still drinks “Yorkshire Tea by the gallon” every day», and «[...] likes the strong stuff – Yorkshire Tea with the gold top milk», according to her granddaughter.

== See also ==
- Bettys and Taylors of Harrogate
