= English Tea House and Restaurant =

Restaurant in Malaysia

Coordinates: 5°50′32.03″N 118°07′00.15″E

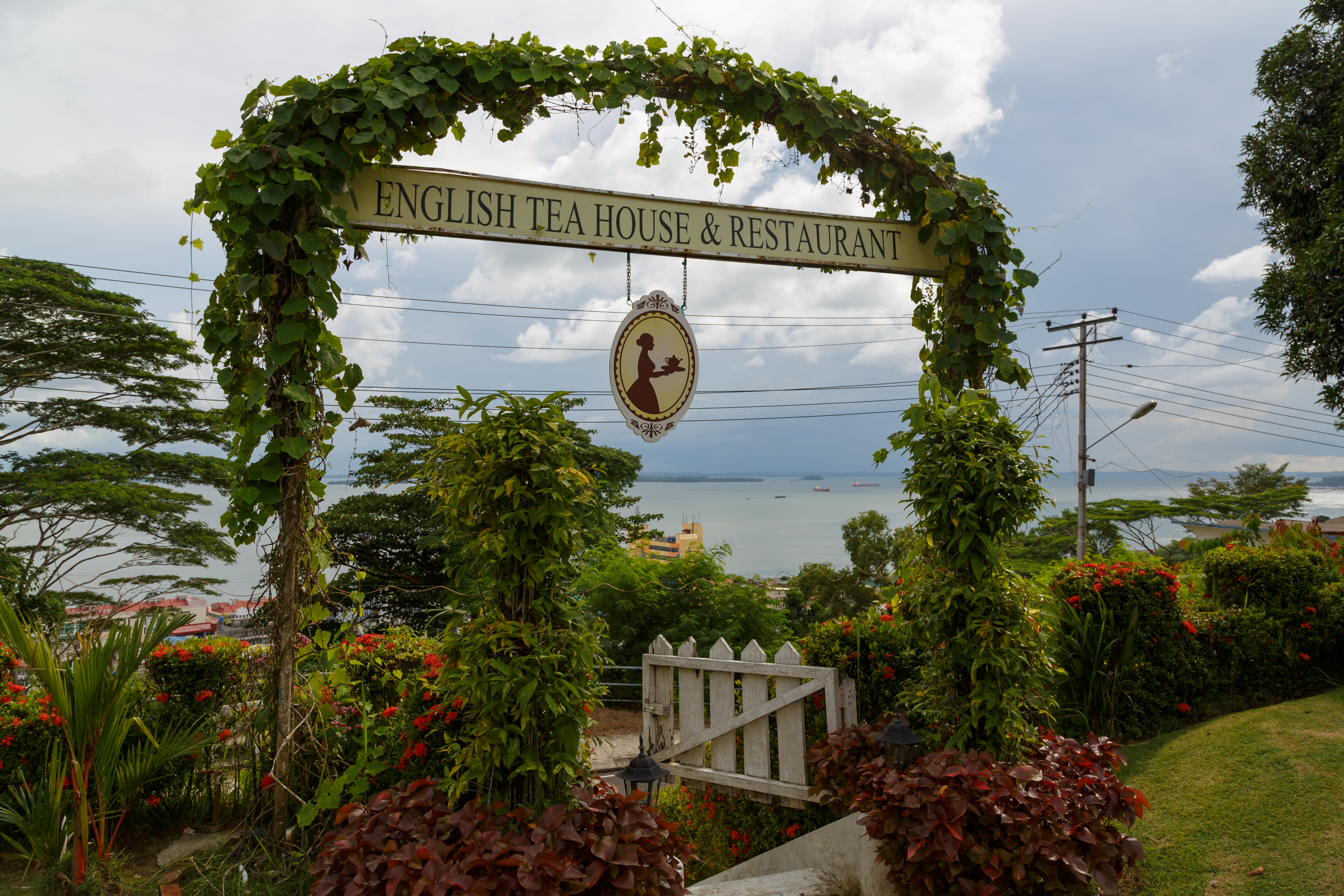
The gate to the tea house and restaurant overlooking the Sulu Sea

The English Tea House and Restaurant is an English tea house and restaurant that is located in Sandakan, Sabah, Malaysia, on a little hill overlooking the Sulu Sea off the Sandakan Bay.

== History ==
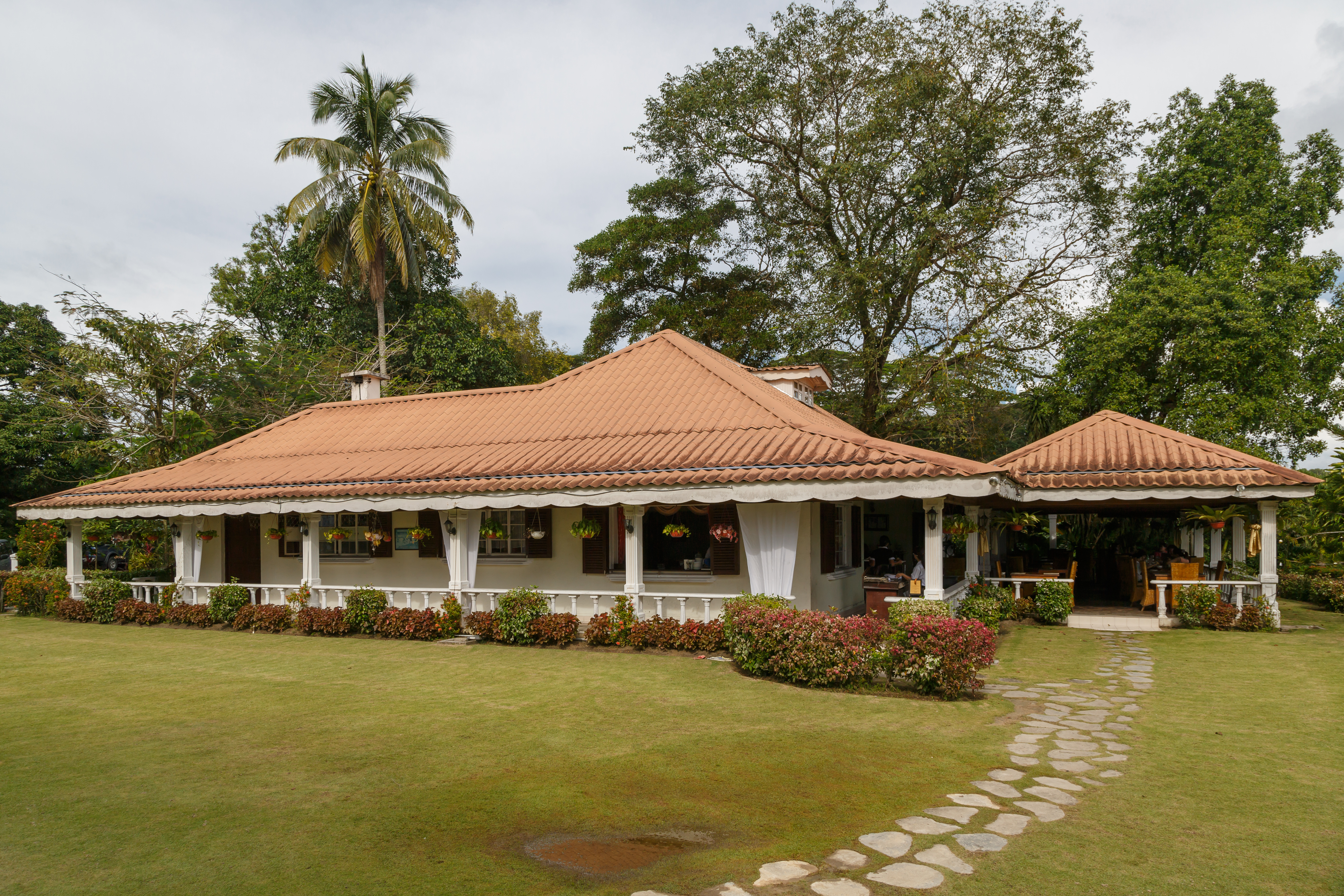
The tea house and restaurant

The tea house was opened on 8 December 2002, with the building architecture inspired by the former house of the American author, Agnes Newton Keith that is situated not far from the tea house.

== Decoration ==
The building is built based on the English colonial architecture and is surrounded by 1.5 acres of manicured lawn, complete with a croquet pitch and outdoor seating.

== Services ==
The restaurant offers traditional English cuisine as well as Asian cuisine.

== See also ==
- List of tea houses
