= Brooke Bond =

Tea brand

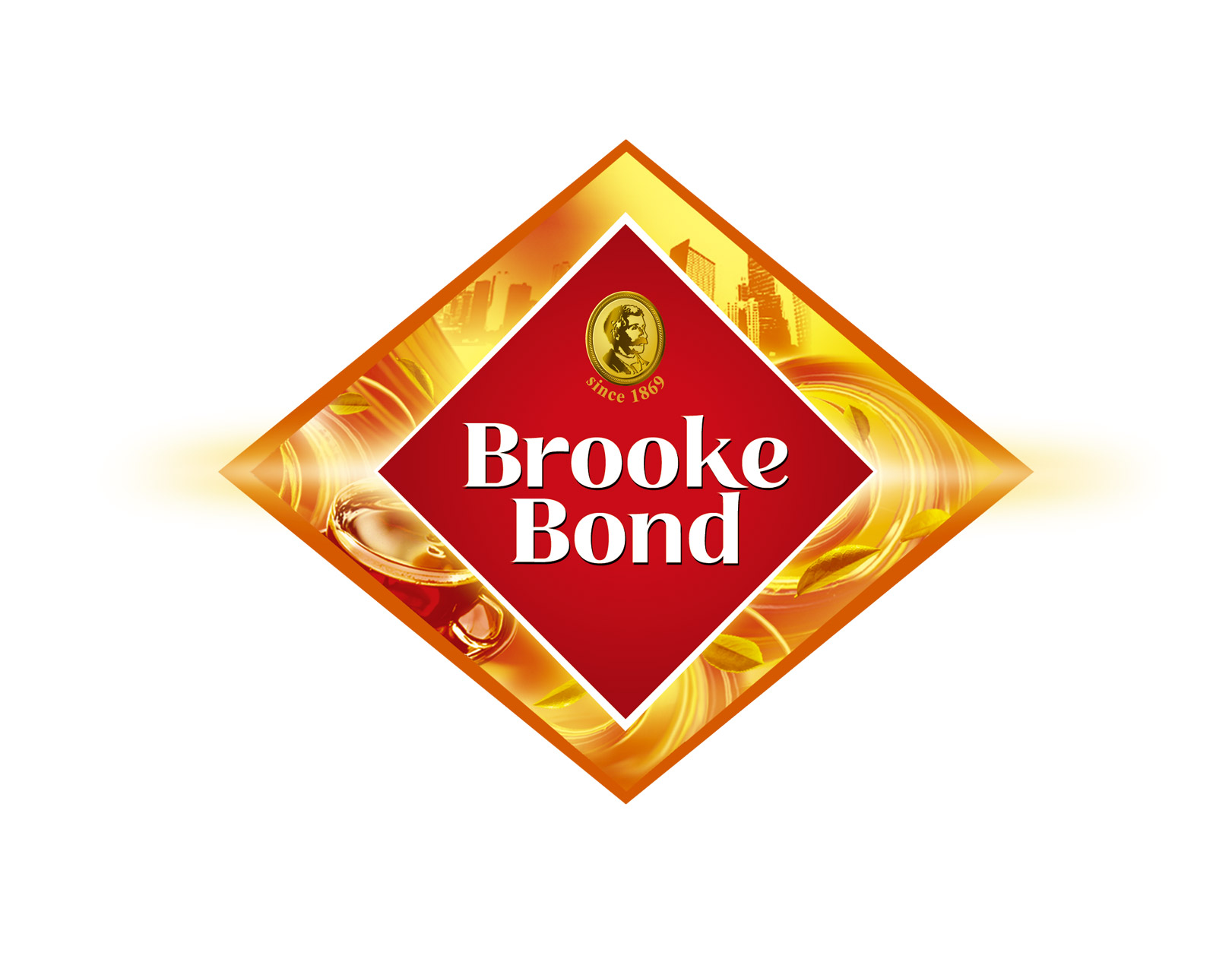
- Industry: Tea
- Founded: 1869; 157 years ago
- Founder: Arthur Brooke
- Headquarters: United Kingdom
- Parent: Lipton Teas and Infusions

Brooke Bond is a brand of tea owned by Lipton Teas and Infusions, except in India, Nepal, and Indonesia where it is owned by Unilever. Brooke Bond was formerly an independent tea-trading and manufacturing company in the United Kingdom, known for its PG Tips brand and its Brooke Bond tea cards.

== History ==
Brooke Bond & Company was founded by Arthur Brooke, who was born at 6 George Street, Ashton-under-Lyne, Lancashire, England, in 1845. In 1869, he opened his first teahouse at 23 Market Street, Manchester. Brooke chose the business name because it was his 'bond' to his customers to provide quality teas, hence Brooke Bond. The firm expanded into wholesale tea sales in the 1870s.

In 1903, Brooke Bond launched Red Label in British India.

In 1908 Brooke Bond set up the Berkshire Printing Company Ltd, based in Reading, as the company's printing division for tea packeting of its products and, notably, the tea cards which they contained. This also expanded from the 1930s to include production of playing cards by high quality lithography.

The company opened a packing factory in Goulston Street, Stepney, London, in 1911.

Brooke Bond's most famous brand is PG Tips, launched under the name Pre-Gest-Tea in 1930.

By 1957, Brooke Bond was probably the largest tea company in the world, with one third share of both the British and Indian tea markets.

In 1972, Brooke Bond launched Laojee in Sri Lanka.

The company merged with Liebig in 1968, becoming Brooke Bond Liebig, which was acquired by Unilever in 1984. The Brooke Bond name was significantly decreased by Unilever, however, the Brooke Bond tea brand was temporarily reintroduced on sale in 2019 in the UK, for its 150th anniversary, after a 20 year absence.

Gold Crown Foods Ltd was licensed by Unilever to use the Brooke Bond name for the Brooke Bond 'D' and Brooke Bond Choicest brands. Today, the licence for D Tea is held by Typhoo, who used to sell it through their website – it had identical packaging to before without the words 'Brooke Bond', although it is not currently available.

Unilever reached an agreement in November 2021 to sell the majority of its tea business to private equity firm CVC Capital Partners for €4.5 billion. This included the Brooke Bond brand except where Unilever retained its use for tea in India, Nepal, and Indonesia. The sale was completed in July 2022, with the new company named Lipton Teas and Infusions.

In Pakistan, Brooke Bond Supreme is the number-one-selling tea brand and is marketed by Lipton Teas and Infusions as being stronger than its Lipton Yellow Label blend.

In North America Brooke Bond's primary product was Red Rose Tea. Red Rose is still sold by Lipton Teas and Infusions in Canada, and by Redco Foods, a subsidiary of Teekanne, in the United States.

The Brooke Bond factory at Trafford Park near Manchester has produced PG Tips since 1930. Now part of Lipton Teas and Infusions, it also produces Pukka herbal teas.

== Brands and origins ==
Brooke Bond Taj Mahal tea leaves are grown in the estates of Upper Assam, Darjeeling and Tripura. They grow on the northern banks of the Brahmaputra river, which floods its banks every monsoon, creating a rich, humid soil. Rain is plentiful in the monsoon season and humidity lasts throughout the year. The soil and weather together give Assam Tea its 'terroir' – a dark red brew, a strong malty flavor and a deep body.

Brooke Bond Red Label is made in tea manufacturing units of Assam, Cooch Behar, Darjeeling and some parts of Meghalaya. The manufacturing process of the tea includes various stages such as withering (leaving the tea leaves to dry), rolling/cutting (through which a complex series of chemical changes known as oxidation is initiated), drying and then grading into sizes.

Brooke Bond Taaza is made of high-quality fresh green tea leaves.

Brooke Bond Supreme is sold in Pakistan, made from Kenyan tea leaves.

Laojee became the number retail tea brand in Sri Lanka.

== Cards ==
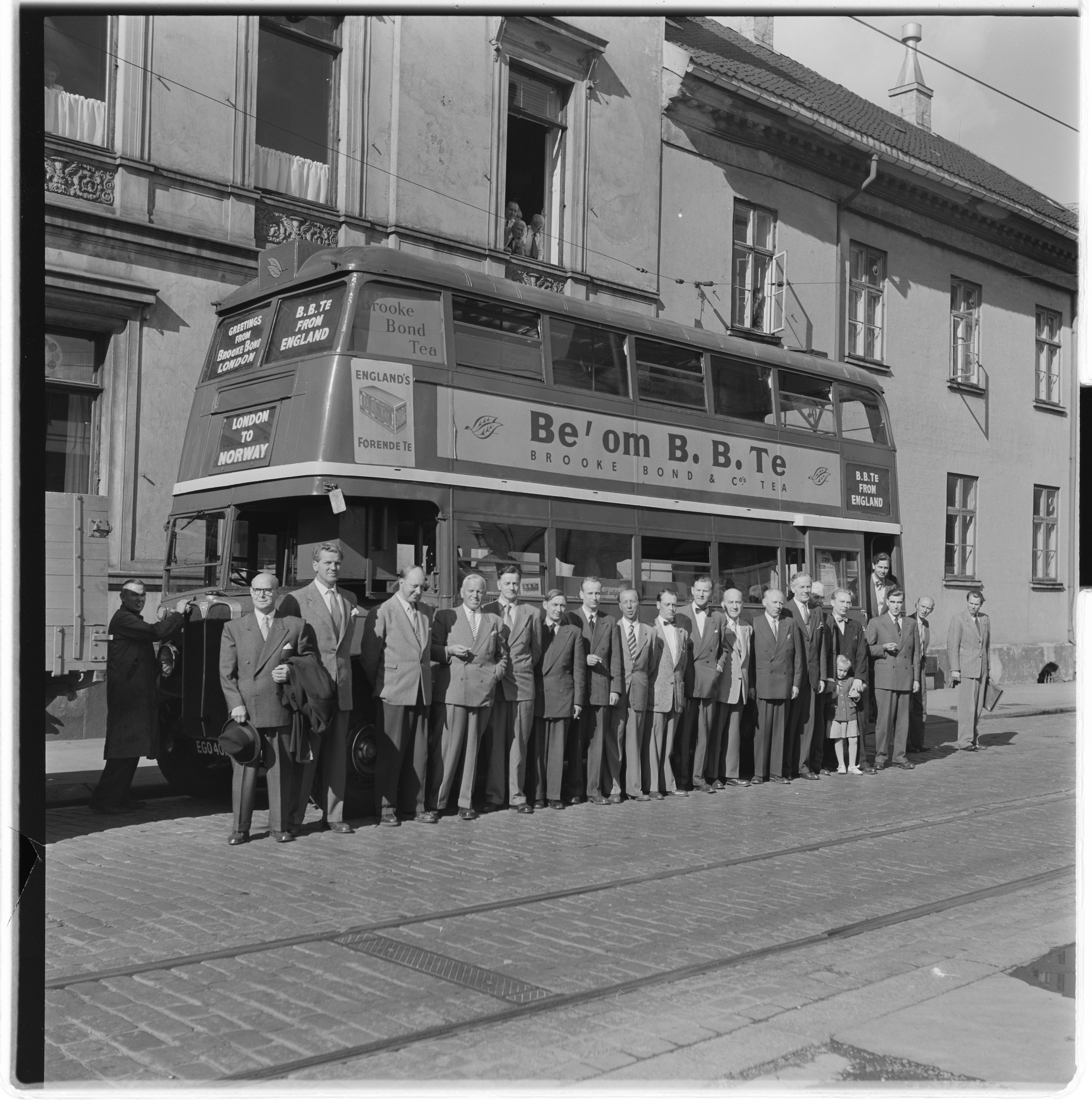
Bus advertisement for Brooke Bond in Oslo, Norway 1955

From 1954 until 1999, packets of Brooke Bond tea included illustrated cards, usually 50 in a series, which were collected by many children. One of the most famous illustrators of the cards was Charles Tunnicliffe, the internationally acclaimed bird painter. Most of the initial series were wildlife-based, including 'British Wild Animals', 'British Wild Flowers', 'African Wild Life', 'Asian Wild Life', and 'Tropical Birds'. From the late 1960s, they included historical subjects, such as 'British Costume', 'History of the Motor Car', and 'Famous Britons'. The last series in the 1990s concentrated on the Chimps of the TV adverts. Complete sets and albums in good condition are highly sought-after collector's items. The inclusion of these cards in packets of tea ceased in 1999. There were about 85 separate titles issued around the world: 59 series issued in the UK (1954–1999), 17 series in Canada (1959–1974; 7 of these were also issued in the US, 1960–66), 6 series in what was Rhodesia (1962–66), and 3 series in South Africa (1965–67). Many of them have since been reprinted.

Other artists used to illustrate the cards included John Beswick (B26), Ley Kenyon (B27), Angus McBride (B21), E.V. Petts (B07), Francis Pitt (B01), Kenneth Rush (B20), Claire Walton (B26), Richard Ward (B11, B14) and Michael Youens (B19).

Complete list of UK sets

Set #	Title	Year of issue	Number of cards in set	Note
B01	British Birds	1954	20	
B02	Wild Flowers – Series 1	1955	50	
B03	Out Into Space	1956	50	
B04	Bird Portraits	1957	50	
B05	British Wild Life	1958	50	
B06	Wild Flowers – Series 2	1959	50	
B07	Freshwater Fish	1960	50	
B08	African Wild Life	1961	50	
B09	Tropical Birds	1961	50	
B10	Asian Wild Life	1962	50	
B11	British Butterflies	1963	50	
B12	Wildlife In Danger	1963	50	
B13	Wild Flowers – Series 3	1964	50	
B14	Butterflies of the World	1964	50	
B15	Wild Birds in Britain	1965	50	
B16	Transport Through the Ages	1966	50	
B17	Trees in Britain	1966	50	
B18	Flags & Emblems of the World	1967	50	
B19	British Costume	1967	50	
B20	History of the Motor Car	1968	50	
B21	Famous People	1969	50	
B22	The Saga of Ships	1970	50	
B23	The Race into Space	1971	50	
B24	Prehistoric Animals	1972	50	
B25	History of Aviation	1972	50	
B26	Adventurers and Explorers	1973	50	
B27	The Sea – Our Other World	1974	50	
L01	Polyfilla Modelling Cards	1974	10	no album – large cards
L02	Zena Skinner's International Cookery	1974	50	no album – large cards
B28	Inventors and Inventions	1975	50	
B29	Wonders of Wildlife	1976	50	
B30	Play Better Soccer	1976	40	
B31	Police File	1977	40	
B32	Vanishing Wildlife	1978	40	
B33	Olympic Greats	1979	40	
B34	Woodland Wildlife	1980	40	
B35	Small Wonders	1981	40	
B36	Queen Elizabeth I – Elizabeth II	1983	50	
B37	Features of the World	1984	50	
B38	Incredible Creatures	1985	40	wall chart only – no album
B39	30 Years of the Chimps – the Chimps Album	1986	12	
B40	Unexplained Mysteries of the World	1987	40	
B41	The Language of Tea	1988	12	wall chart only – no album
B42	Discovering Our Coast	1989	50	
B43	The Magical World of Disney	1989	25	
B44	A Journey Downstream	1990	25	
B45	Teenage Mutant Hero Turtles: Dimension X Escapade	1991	12	
B46	Olympic Challenge 1992	1992	40	
B47	Natural Neighbours	1993	40	
B48	The Dinosaur Trail	1993	20	
B49	40 Years of cards	1994	48	mail order only – not included in boxes of tea
B50	Creatures of Legend	1994	24	
B51	Going Wild	1994	40	
B52	The Secret Diary of Kevin Tipps	1995	50	
B53	PG Chimps 40th Anniversary of Television Advertising	1996	40	
B54	Pyramid Power	1996	45	
B55	The Wonderful World of Kevin Tipps	1997	30	
B56	International Soccer Stars	1998	20	
B57	Oracle Cards	1999	19	no album; cards were held over a hot cup of tea, the heat revealed a 'prediction'
	Survey Card	1999	1	survey to ask if customers wanted Brooke Bond to keep issuing sets of cards or not
	Thank You Card	1999	1	
	Farewell to PG Tips	1999	3	

== See also ==
- Brooke Bond Taj Mahal Tea House
- Lipton
- Lipton Teas and Infusions
- PG Tips
