= Tea and Sympathy (restaurant) =

Restaurant in New York City

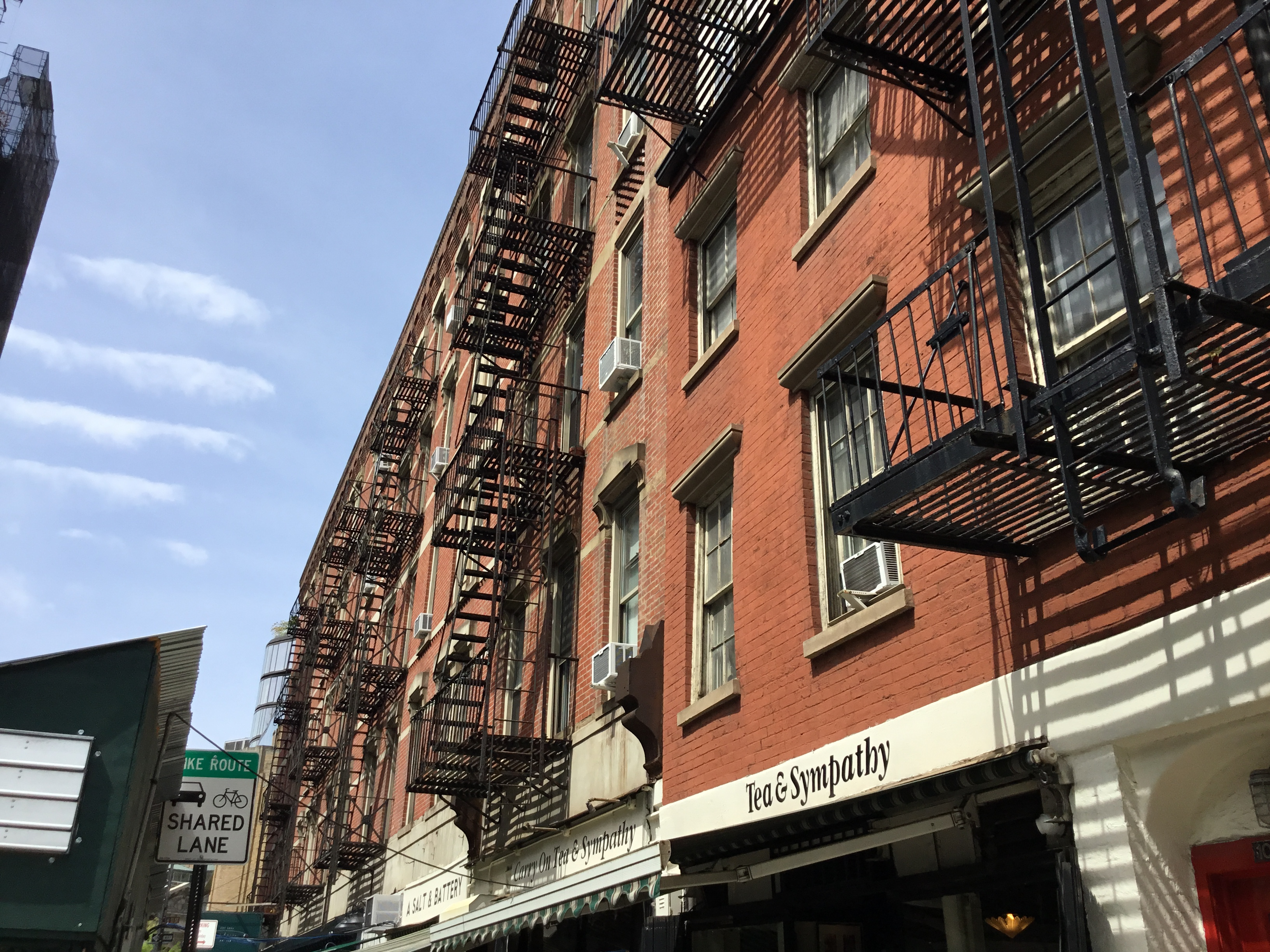
- The trio of businesses, pictured in 2022
- Interactive map of Tea and Sympathy

Restaurant information
- Established: 1990 (36 years ago)
- Owners: Nicky Perry (co-owner); Audrey Kavanagh-Dowsett (co-owner)
- Food type: British
- Location: 108 Greenwich Avenue, New York City, New York, 10011, United States
- Coordinates: 40.73832°N 74.00194°W
- Seating capacity: 22
- Website: teaandsympathy.com

Tea and Sympathy is a tea room-style restaurant in the West Village neighborhood of Manhattan, New York City. A British-themed establishment established in 1990, it is located at 108 Greenwich Avenue.

The restaurant is co-owned by Nicky Perry, a Londoner who moved to the United States in 1981, and her daughter, Audrey Kavanagh-Dowsett. Perry originally co-owned the restaurant with her husband, Sean Kavanagh-Dowsett, who died from cancer in 2023.

In 2019, Perry and Kavanagh-Dowsett were paying a combined $28,000 monthly rent for the restaurant and the two adjacent stores they also co-owned: Carry on Tea and Sympathy (opened in 1996) and A Salt and Battery (opened in 2000).

David Bowie celebrated his 50th birthday at the restaurant in 1997.

In 2002, the restaurant had 22 seats.

The businesses in the block in which the restaurant is located, between West 12th and West 13th Streets, have struggled since the closure of St. Vincent's Hospital in 2010. Around thirty businesses closed over the next three years. In 2018, Tea and Sympathy started a GoFundMe to keep the business afloat.

== See also ==
- List of restaurants in New York City
- List of teahouses
