= Tealuxe =

US chain of tea houses

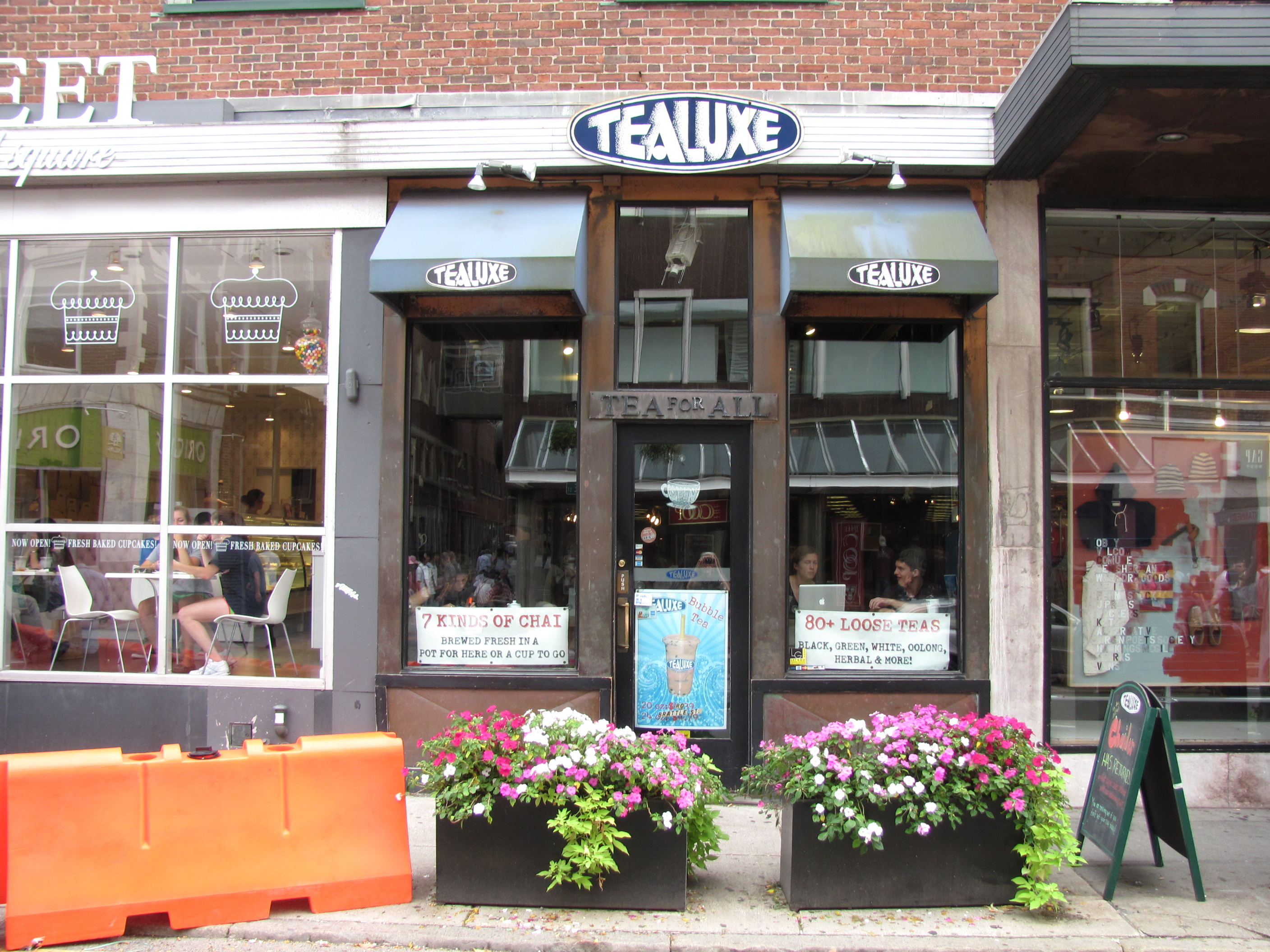
Tealuxe in Cambridge, Massachusetts

Tealuxe was a chain of tea houses founded in Massachusetts in 1996 by Bruce Fernie and Katherine Walsh. With an original location in Harvard Square and later expanding to the greater Boston area as well as New York and Rhode Island, Tealuxe operated until 2019, when it closed its last remaining store in Providence, Rhode Island.

== History ==
The Tealuxe chain of tea houses was founded in Massachusetts in 1996 by Bruce Fernie and Katherine Walsh. They aimed to create a tea house that felt like a French cafe. In 1999, they opened a second location in Back Bay, Boston, which operated until 2010. In 2000, they began opening locations in New York City.

In 2000 Fernie and Walsh sold control of the company to a Boston-based venture capital firm.

In 2001, Tealuxe reported that its top store grossed between $1million and $1.2million annually, comparable with a Starbucks store at the time.

In 2010 Tealuxe was named one of Yankee Magazine's Best 5 New England Teahouses.

Its original location, in Harvard Square at Zero Brattle Street, Cambridge Massachusetts, closed in December 2018 after 19 years. The final Providence, Rhode Island location closed in June 2019.
