= Lake Agnes Tea House =

Coordinates: 51.4162°N 116.2440°W

Lake Agnes Tea House is a popular destination for hikers and tourists.

== Location ==
Lake Agnes Tea House is situated on the shores of Lake Agnes.

Lake Agnes was named after the original First Lady of Canada, Lady Agnes MacDonald, and she was the wife of Canada's first Prime Minister, Sir John A. Macdonald. The beauty of Lake Agnes so delighted Lady MacDonald when she visited it in 1886 that it subsequently bore her name.

Both Lake Agnes and the tea house are located in Lake Louise, Alberta, Canada, at an elevation of 2,135 m (7,005 ft) above sea level.

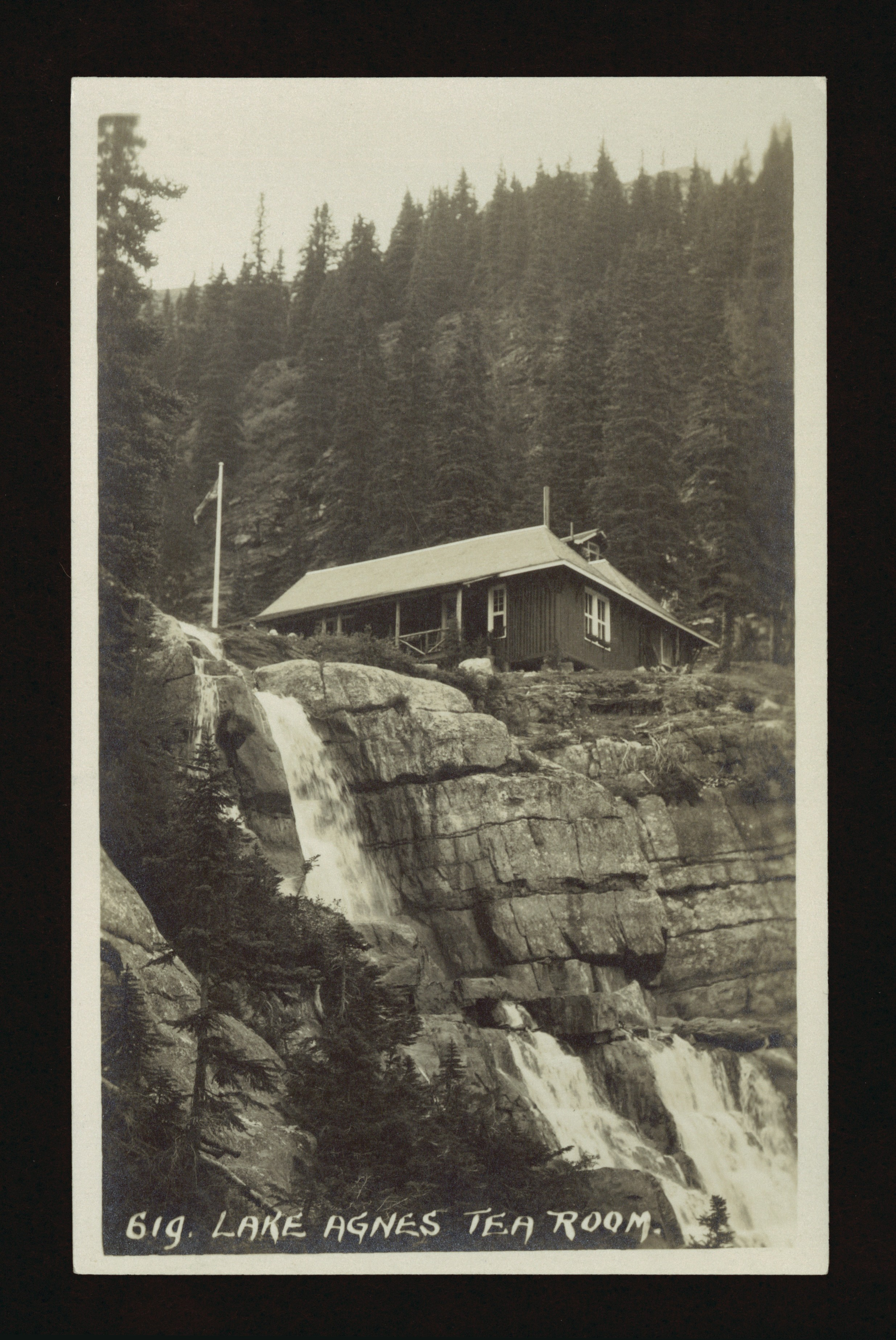
A view from a lower cliff looking up at the Tea House circa. 1920.

== History ==
The Lake Agnes Tea House was built in 1901 by the Canadian Pacific Railway as a refuge for hikers. It started serving tea in 1905 and has been called the oldest teahouse in Canada.

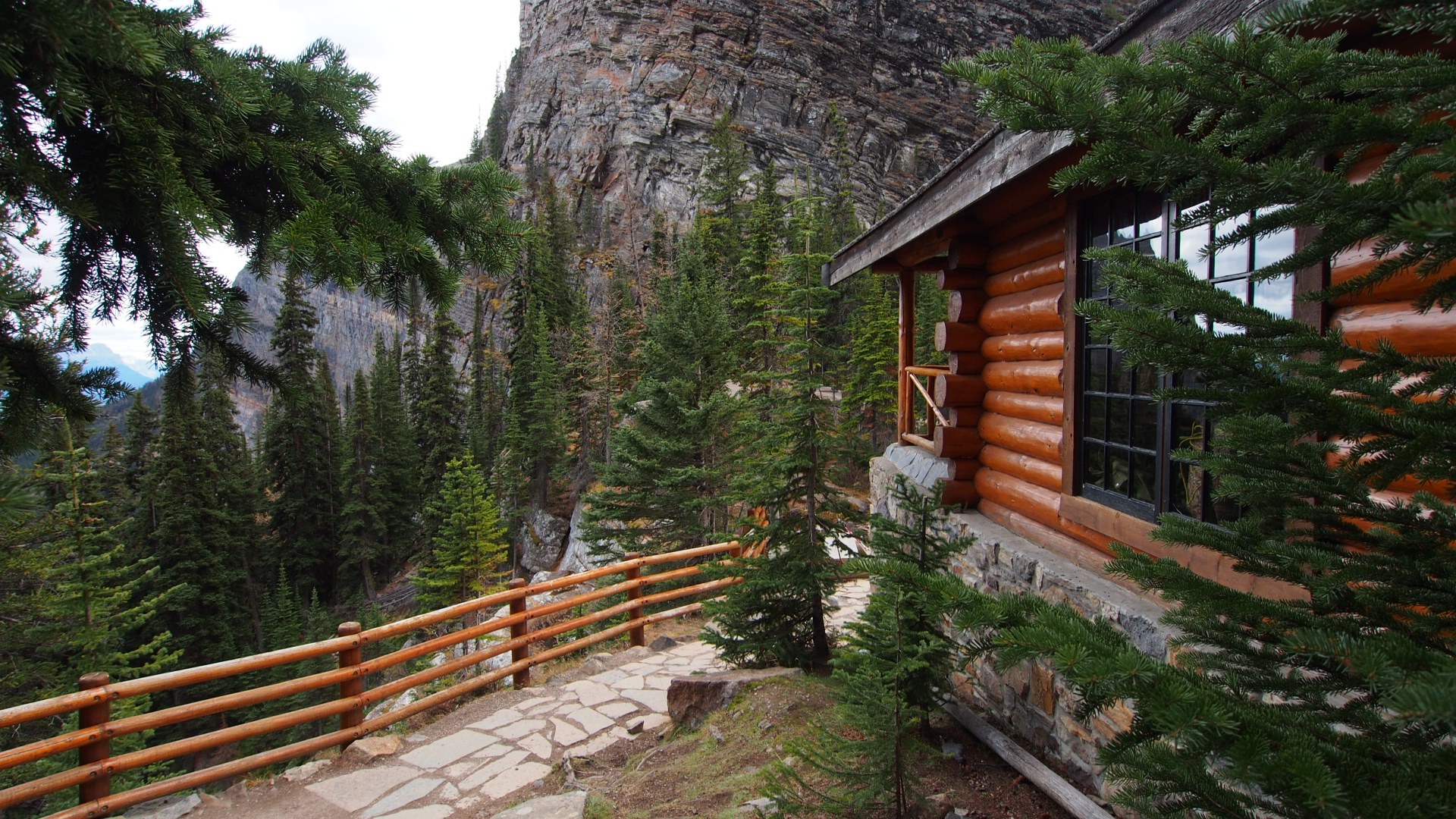
A partial view of Lake Agnes Tea House.

The original log building was replaced in 1981. The new structure features windows, tables, and chairs from the original building.

== Tourism ==
The Lake Agnes Tea House is only accessible on foot or horseback through what is informally called the Lake Agnes Tea House Trail. Lake Agnes Tea House staff carry fresh food supplies to the teahouse daily. Dry goods (e.g flour, sugar, oats, propane) are flown in annually by helicopter.

Before arriving at the lake and tea house, visitors must complete a forested 3.5 km hike. The Lake Agnes Tea House hike has an elevation gain of 400 m (1,300 ft). The trail itself is marked and trafficked.

Lake Agnes Tea House is open from June to October; the teahouse is not operational in the cold winter months.

=== The Tea House Challenge ===
Many keen hikers take on the “Tea House Challenge.” This challenge involves visiting the Lake Agnes Tea House and Plain of Six Glaciers Tea House in one day. The two tea houses connect via the Highline trail, forming a 14.6-kilometre loop. It takes around 5 hours of hiking to complete.

=== Beehive Hike ===
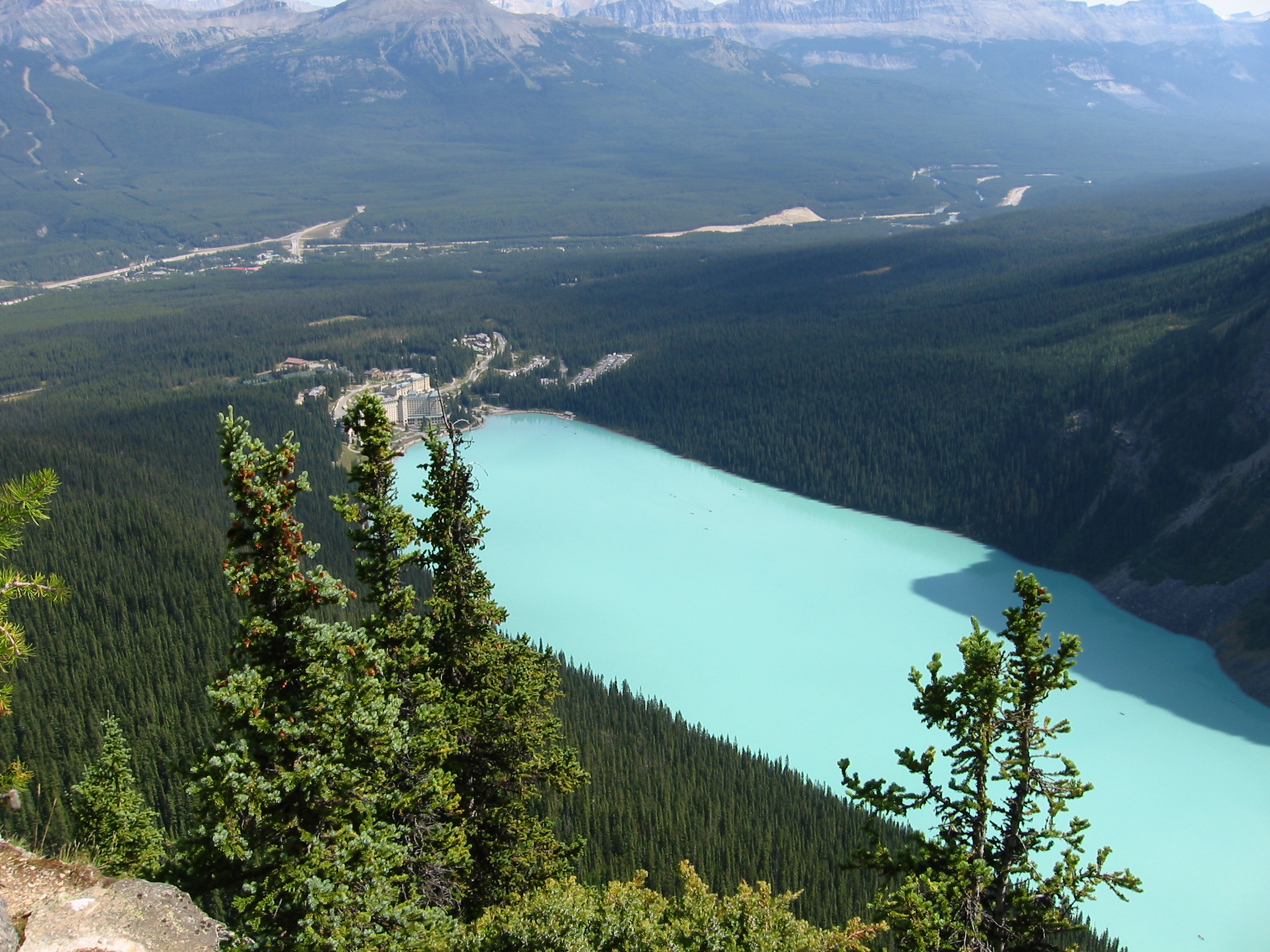
The view of LakeLouise from the Big Beehive

Those who hike to Lake Agnes Tea House may also choose to complete the Beehive Hike. The Beehive Hike in Lake Louise is a 10.9 kilometer heavily trafficked trail loop.

== Recognition ==
The Lake Agnes Tea House is recognized as one of the top-rated tourist attractions in Banff National Park.

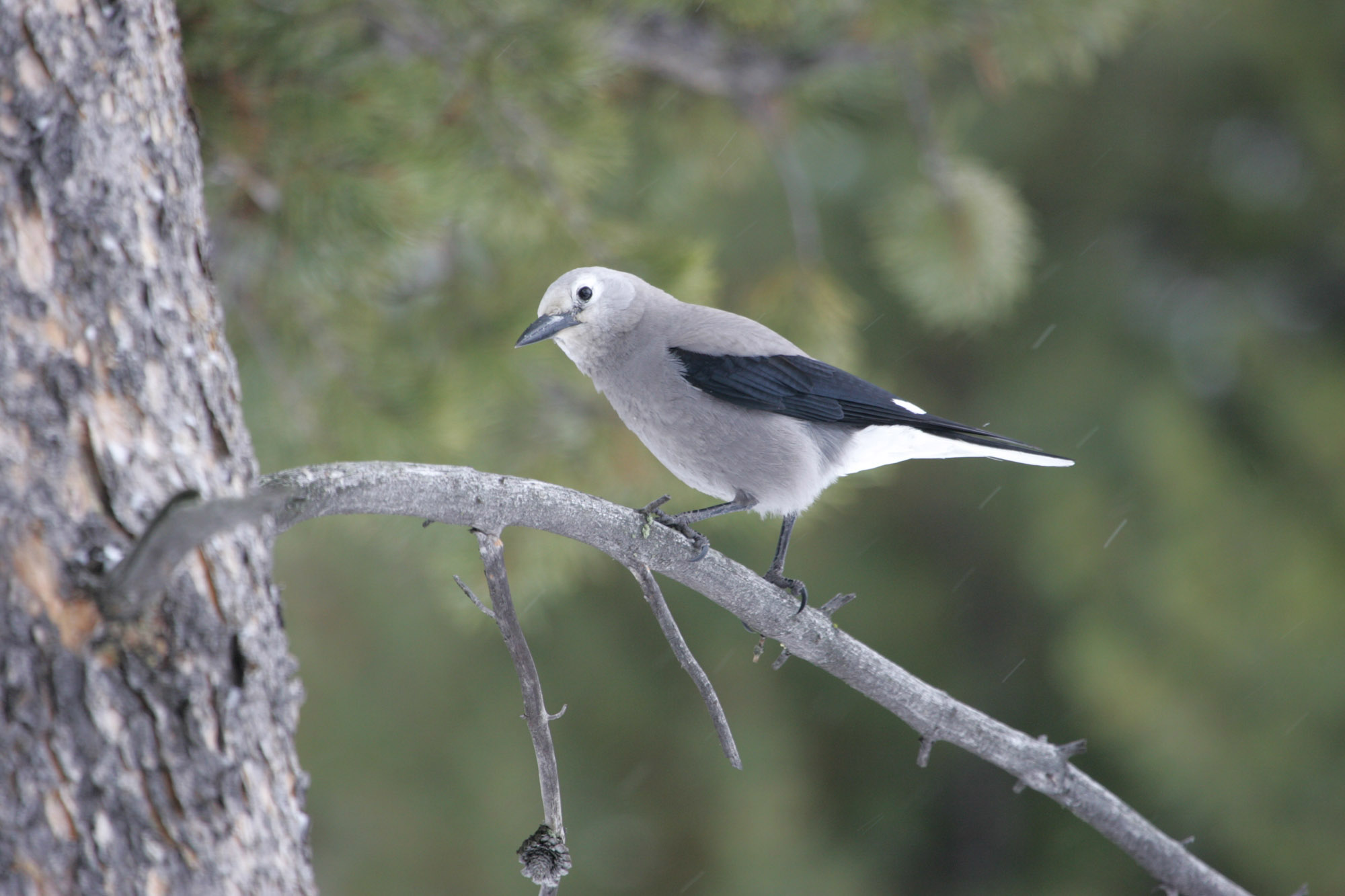
Clark's Nutcracker

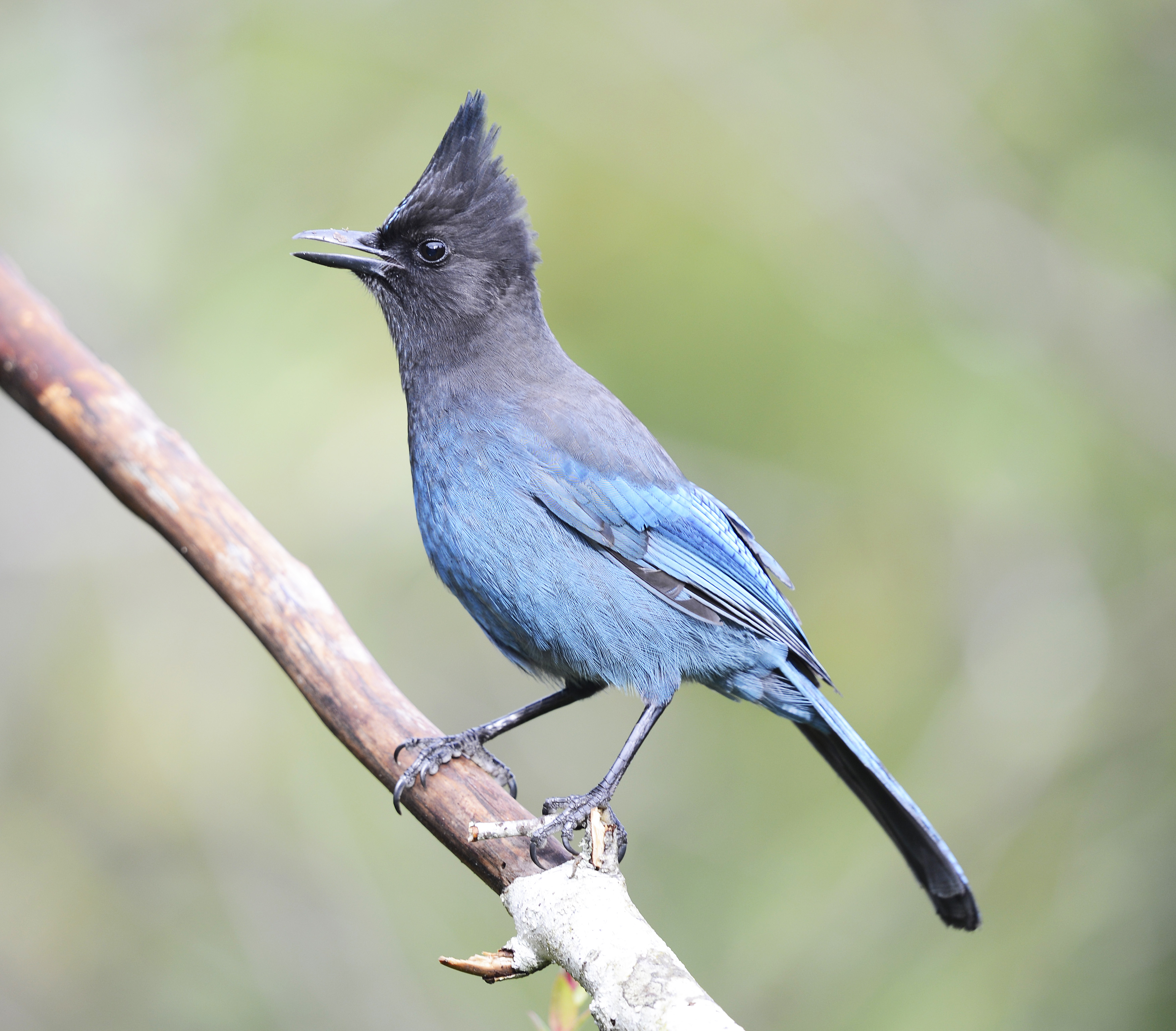
Steller's Jay

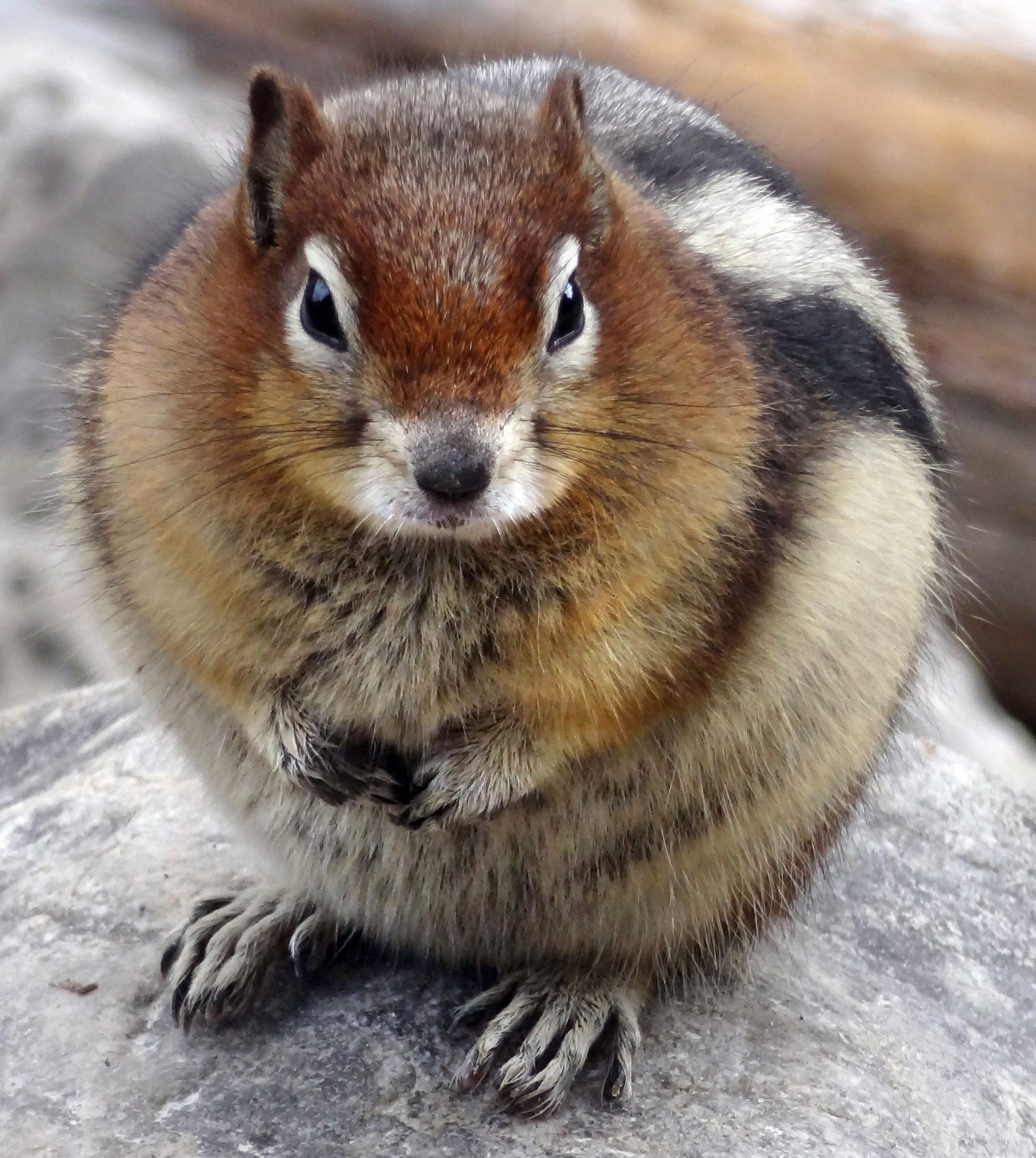
Golden-mantled ground squirrel begging at the Tea House
