= Lake Agnes (Alberta) =

Lake in Alberta, Canada

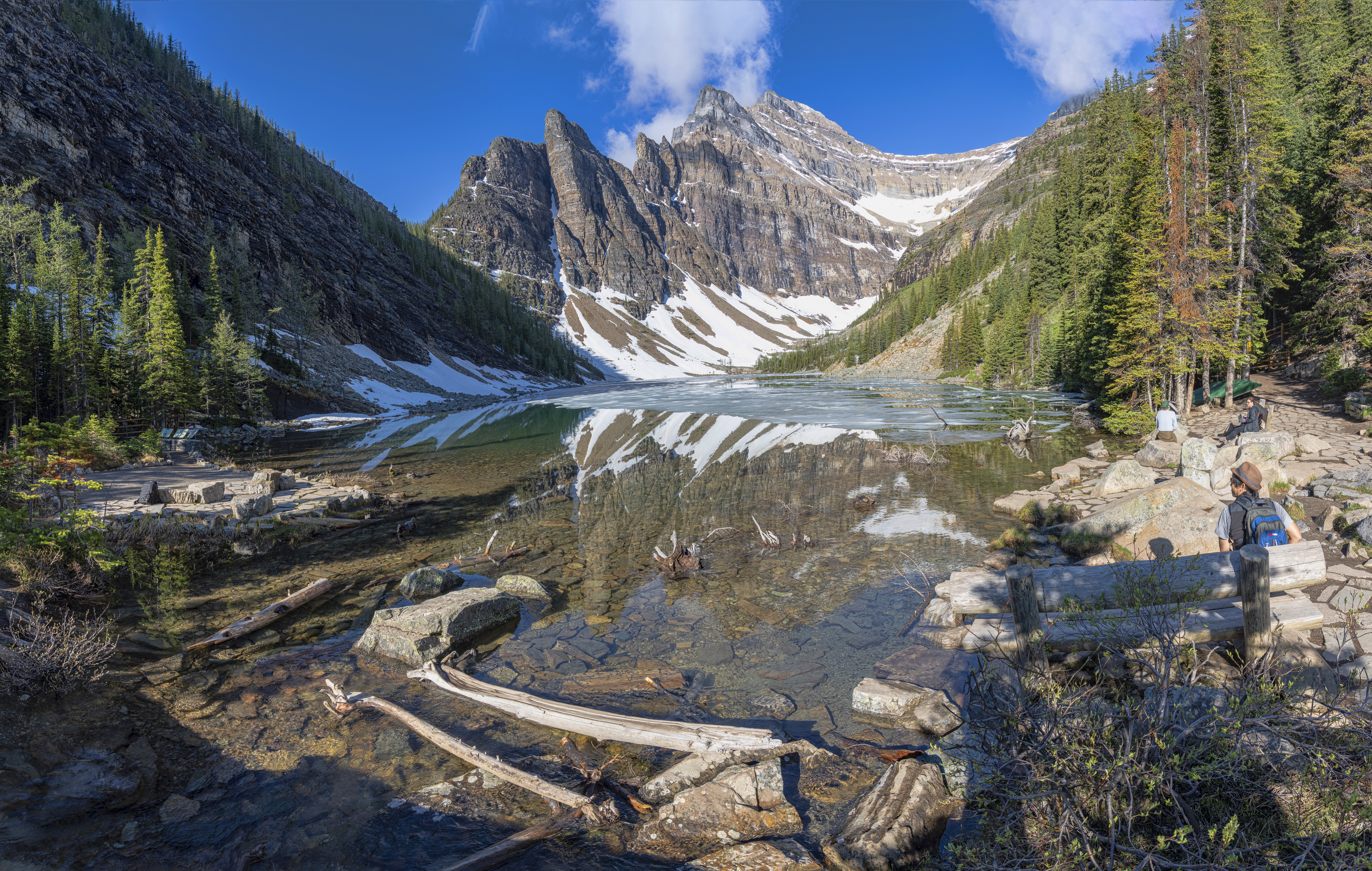

- Location within Canada Location within Alberta
- Location: Banff National Park, Alberta
- Coordinates: 51°24′53″N 116°14′50″W
- Basin countries: Canada
- Surface area: 0.052 km^{2} (0.020 sq mi)

Lake Agnes is a small mountain lake in the Banff National Park of Alberta, Canada.

It has a surface area of 0.052 km^{2} and is located approximately 3.5 km (one-way) hiking distance from Lake Louise. A teahouse is situated along the eastern shore at an elevation of 2134 metres (7002 ft). A hiking trail continues down the northern shore, making a 180° turn before ascending to the Big Beehive. Just before the trail starts the arc, a scrambling route up Mount Niblock can be found.

The Little Beehive can be ascended to the east of Lake Agnes. At the top, there are excellent views of the Continental Divide. The Lake Agnes Tea House is situated on the eastern shores of the lake.
