= The Beehive (Alberta) =

Mountain in Alberta, Canada

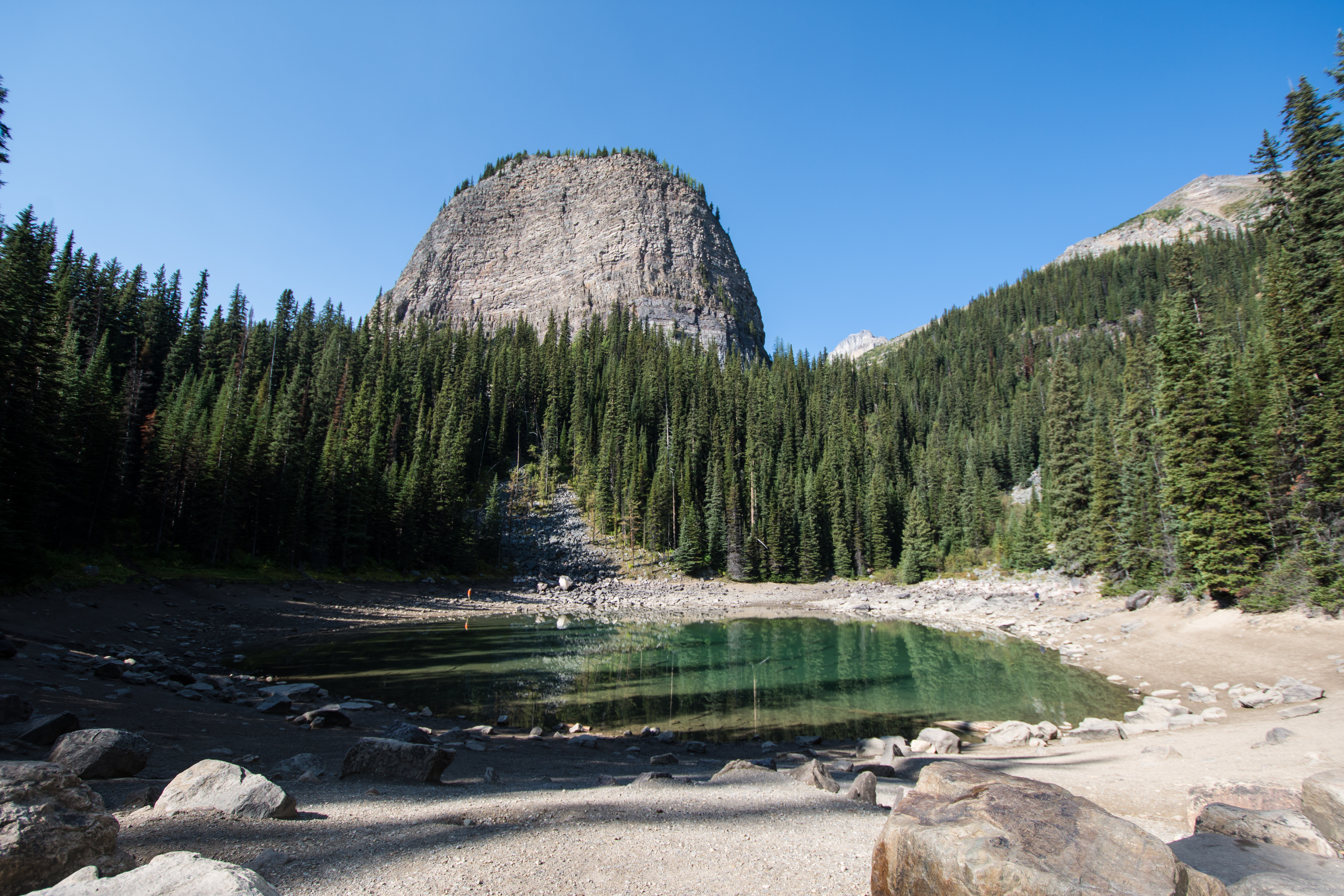
- Mirror Lake with Big Beehive

Highest point
- Elevation: 2,270 m (7,450 ft)
- Listing: Mountains of Alberta
- Coordinates: 51°24′51″N 116°14′38″W

Geography
- Location within Alberta
- Country: Canada
- Province: Alberta
- Protected area: Banff National Park
- Parent range: Bow Range
- Topo map: NTS 82N8 Lake Louise

Climbing
- First ascent: 1891 by Samuel Allen
- Easiest route: Hike

The Beehive is a mountain located in Banff National Park of Alberta, Canada. It was named by J. Willoughby Astley in 1890 because the mountain resembles a beehive. The mountain is also known as the Big Beehive as there is a smaller beehive shaped mountain nearby called the Little Beehive.

The mountain is located above Lake Louise and can be accessed via hiking trails either from Lake Louise or Lake Agnes.
