= John Floyer =

John Floyer may refer to:

- John Floyer (physician) (1649–1734), English physician and author
- John Floyer (Tamworth MP) (c1681–1762), English politician, MP for Tamworth 1741–42
- John Floyer (Dorset MP) (1811–1887), English politician, MP for Dorset 1846–67 and 1864–95
