= Canwell (disambiguation) =

Canwell is a village in the civil parish of Hints.

Canwell may also refer to:

- Albert F. Canwell (1907–2002), an American journalist and politician
- Canwell Committee, a special investigative committee
- Canwell Priory, a monastic house in England
