= Norton Juxta Twycross =

Village in Leicestershire, England

Coordinates: 52.6601°N 1.5244°W

Norton: Norton Juxta Twycross
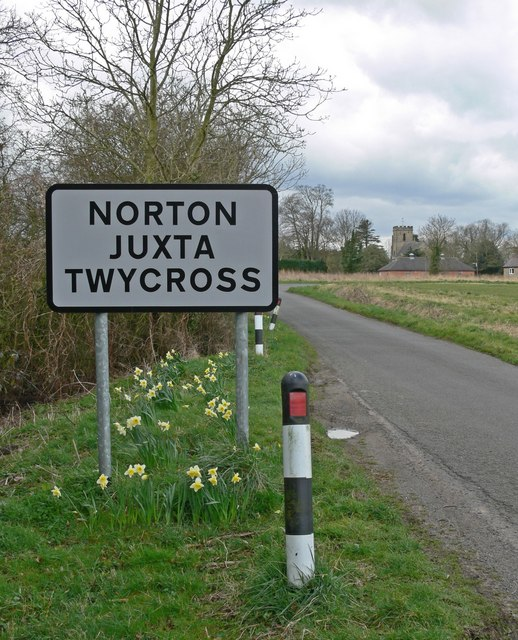
- Entrance Sign to the village, with the Church in the background.

- Location within Leicestershire
- Civil parish: Twycross
- District: Hinckley and Bosworth
- Shire county: Leicestershire
- Region: East Midlands
- Country: England
- Sovereign state: United Kingdom
- Post town: ATHERSTONE
- Postcode district: CV9
- Dialling code: 01827
- Police: Leicestershire
- Fire: Leicestershire
- Ambulance: East Midlands
- UK Parliament: Bosworth

Norton Juxta Twycross, usually known as simply "Norton" (or "Norton-Juxta"), is a village and former civil parish, now in the parish of Twycross, in the Hinckley and Bosworth district of Leicestershire, England. The village is part of the church parish of Appleby Magna, with the vicar based in Appleby. In 1931 the parish had a population of 249.

== History ==
The village has traditionally, and historically, been known as "Norton": deriving from the Anglo-Saxon, meaning "North-Town"; with variable spellings including "Northton" and "Nortone". The village, however, was also known for a brief period in the 17th century as "Hoggs Norton". The village's current name was acquired to differentiate the village from the several others in the county named Norton. "Juxta" is Latin for "near", and Twycross is a small village approximately 2 miles southeast of Norton.

The village of Norton is thought to have been founded in the 8th or 9th century by the Anglo-Saxons. The Anglo-Saxon King Æthelred granted the village a charter in 951, referring to it as "Northton"

The village is listed in the Domesday Book of 1086 as "Norton", and the Lord of the Manor was recorded in both 1066 and 1086 as Countess (Lady) Godiva, widow of Leofric, Earl of Mercia, famed (legendarily) for riding naked around the streets of Coventry. In both 1066 and 1086 the village is recorded as worth £0.3. The village is listed as a very small settlement, with only four households, but has a quite large taxable value of 6 geld units. The Domesday Book records the village as home to 1 villager, 2 small holders and a priest, and is recorded as having land for 7 ploughs and 8 acres of meadow.

In 1325 several people in Norton were arrested for the murder of Sir William de Monte Gomeri, which took place near to Merevale Abbey. Philippa, widow of the murdered Sir William, said that it was in the manor house at Norton, belonging to Walter de Monte Gomeri(unclear how they are related; may have been brother of deceased), that Robert de Gresley had sent his brother Peter to kill her husband. He was struck over the head by a sword, and died in Phillipa's arms. Philippa accused Joan, wife of Walter de Monte Gomeri of also being present at Norton Manor during that meeting, and of "aiding, abetting and procuring the death of her husband".
Robert and Joan appeared before the County Court and were transferred for trial at the Court of King's Bench. Both stated they were not guilty but only Joan was given bail until the trial. The jury of their trial returned a not guilty verdict for the pair. Peter de Greseleye and another supposed accomplice William de Northfolk, both failed to appear before the County Court and were declared outlaws.

In 1839 it was recorded as a chapelry within the parish of Orton on the Hill. On 1 April 1935 the parish was abolished and merged with Twycross.

=== Holy Trinity Church ===
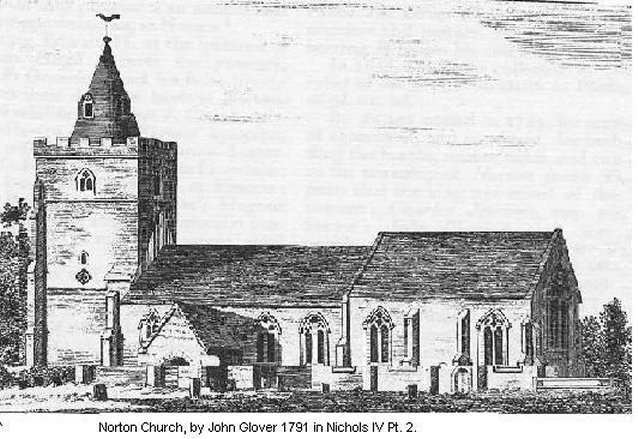
Holy Trinity Church c. 1791, before the spire was demolished

The Village's parish church is dedicated to The Holy Trinity.

The original church was built of wood in the 12th century, and the village acquiring its first rector in 1220, whilst the church's Advowson was under the control of Belvoir Priory.

The church seen today was built in the early 14th century, although it was heavily restored around 1841. The tower formerly had a small spire, but this was dismantled in 1890 as it had become unsafe. The tower had also originally contained 3 bells: 1640 and the other two in 1663. One, however, was recast in 1849. The tower's clock was made by Samuel Deacon's company in Barton in the Beans. It was installed on 1 September 1840, having cost £80. The church vesty was built in 1850 and cost £100 to construct.

The church is unusual in having two pulpits. The church's Gothic-style barrel organ was built in 1819, in London, by James Butler: an apprentice of George England. It was installed within the church in 1840, and restored in 1980 by John Burns of Nuneaton.

In 1829, on the appointment of the Hon. Alfred Curzon as rector, the parish was revealed to have an annual income of £332 9s. 11¼d; £200 of which came from the rental of the church's Glebe lands and the rental of part of the parsonage house.

==== Rectors ====
Rectors of Holy Trinity Church, Norton: (incomplete)

- Ralph de Querendon, - (resigned 1329)
- William de Lobenham, - (1329 - ) Subdean of Sarum
- Robert Bytham, - (resigned 1421)
- Thomas Farmer, - (c. 1564)
- Thomas Royle, - (died 1609)
- Gabriel Rosse, - (1609 - 1658)
- Josiah Whiston, - (1661 - 1685)
- Theophilus Brookes, - (died 1711)
- Reubens Clarke, - (1711 - 1728)
- Lancelot Jackson, - (1728 - 1745)
- John Clayton, - (31 May 1745 - 1791)
- William Carson, - (27 June 1796 - April 1811)
- The Hon. Alfred Curzon, - (14 October 1829 - ) Son of the 2nd Baron Scarsdale: Lived mainly at Kedlestone, his role filled by a curate.
- Andrew Bloxam, - (c. 1843) a Naturalist who in the 1820s had sailed on botanical expeditions to the South Seas, aboard HMS Blonde)
- William Thomas Pearce Mead King, - (1850)
- Thomas Cox, - (1869)
- John Thomas Walker, - (1877)
- Herbert Coke Fowler, - (1891)
- Thomas John Williams-Fisher, - (1907)
- William Callahan, - (1916)
- John Carpenter, - (1918)

=== Norton Rectory ===
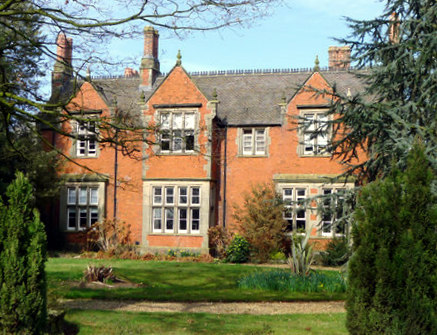
The former Norton Rectory, built 1850

There have been several rectories (earlier known as parsonage houses) at Norton. In 1725 Reverend Reuben Clark built a new rectory, but this had fallen into disrepair by 1797. Reverend William Carsons (tenure 1746-1811) attempted to undertake repairs, but they were not completed. When The Hon. Alfred Curzon (son of Nathaniel Curzon, 2nd Baron Scarsdale) took over the position of rector in 1829, the house was still unsuitable. Curzon (who had gained his position through family connections to the local land owner, the Earl Howe) chose to reside instead in a house near to his birthplace at Kedleston Hall, Derbyshire (over 27 miles away): his duties as priest fulfilled by a curate from the neighbouring parish of Appleby Magna. This lack of occupation is probably the cause of the rectory's ongoing dilapidation, which was confirmed again in 1835 when the Rectory was described as being in "a bad and dangerous state".

In 1842 the then Rector, Andrew Bloxham, applied to receive Queen Anne's Bounty in order to repair the rectory.

Plans to rebuild were obviously abandoned when in 1850 reverend William Thomas Pearce Mead King constructed a new vicarage to the South-West of the village. The old rectory and outbuildings still remained until at least 1887, however, when they were being used as a farm.

Pearce Mead King's new construction served as the village's rectory until Norton joined Appleby Magna Parish, at which point it became a private residence, known as Norton Grange. In 1963 Norton Grange and its 12-acre gardens, were purchased for £12,000 by zoologist Molly Badham, who founded Twycross Zoo (at first known as The East Midlands Zoological Society) in the rectory's gardens. Molly and the Zoo are famed for her work training Chimps, most notably for use in the PG Tips Tea Television advertisements which ran from the 1960s to the 1980s.

== Population ==
The Hearth tax reveals there were 16 families living in the village in 1564 and a total of 40 inhabitants were charged the tax in 1664.

In 1829 the parish of Norton is revealed to have had a population of 301; with an additional 74 living in an exclave of the parish at Bilston.
