= River Mease SSSI =

Protected area in Leicestershire, England

Coordinates: 52.704°N 1.592°W

River Mease
- Site of Special Scientific Interest
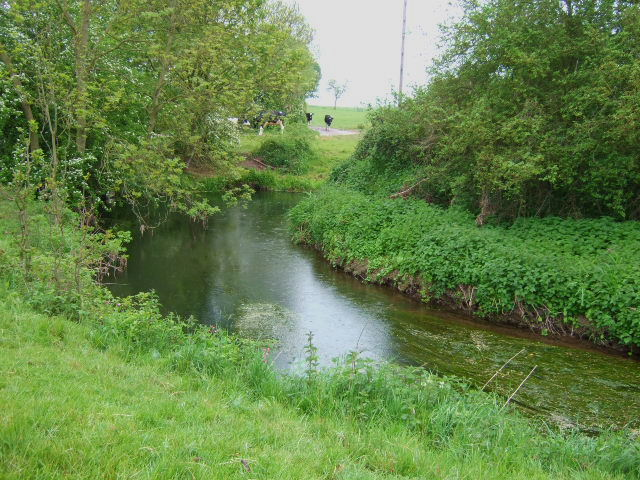
- Location of River Mease.
- Area of search: Leicestershire; Staffordshire
- Grid reference: SK 264 119
- Interest: Biological
- Area: 23.0 hectares (57 acres)
- Notification date: 2000
- Location map: Magic Map

River Mease SSSI is a 23.0 hectares (57 acres) biological Site of Special Scientific Interest. It is a stretch of the River Mease and its tributary Gilwiskaw Brook, running between Alrewas in Staffordshire and Packington in Leicestershire. It is also a Special Area of Conservation The river goes through private land, but it is crossed by roads and footpaths.

The River Mease rises near the village of Norton Juxta Twycross in North West Leicestershire. It flows westwards for approximately 16 miles (25 km), largely through agricultural land, to its confluence with the River Trent at Croxall in Staffordshire. The SSSI includes a range of habitats including riffles, pools, slacks, vegetated margins and variable amounts of bankside tree cover. The site also includes part of the fast-flowing Gilwiskaw Brook.

The river has nationally significant populations of two species of freshwater fish, the spined loach and the bullhead. Vegetation is sparse in the upper reaches as the stream is fast-flowing, but there are stands of floating sweet-grass, and the gravel areas provide favourable conditions for the bullhead to spawn. The freshwater white-clawed crayfish Austropotamobius pallipes is also found in the river as is the otter, both having a restricted range in the East Midlands.

Aquatic flora is more varied in the lower reaches, where the river flows slowly across a flood plain. Here the marginal vegetation includes common club-rush, floating sweet-grass, reed canary-grass, branched bur-reed, greater pond sedge and bulrush. Submerged aquatic vegetation includes river water-crowfoot, common water-crowfoot, blunt-leaved pondweed, fennel pondweed, arrowhead and yellow water-lily.
