= Pulse watch =

Electronic device for monitoring heart rate

Modern Pulse Watch
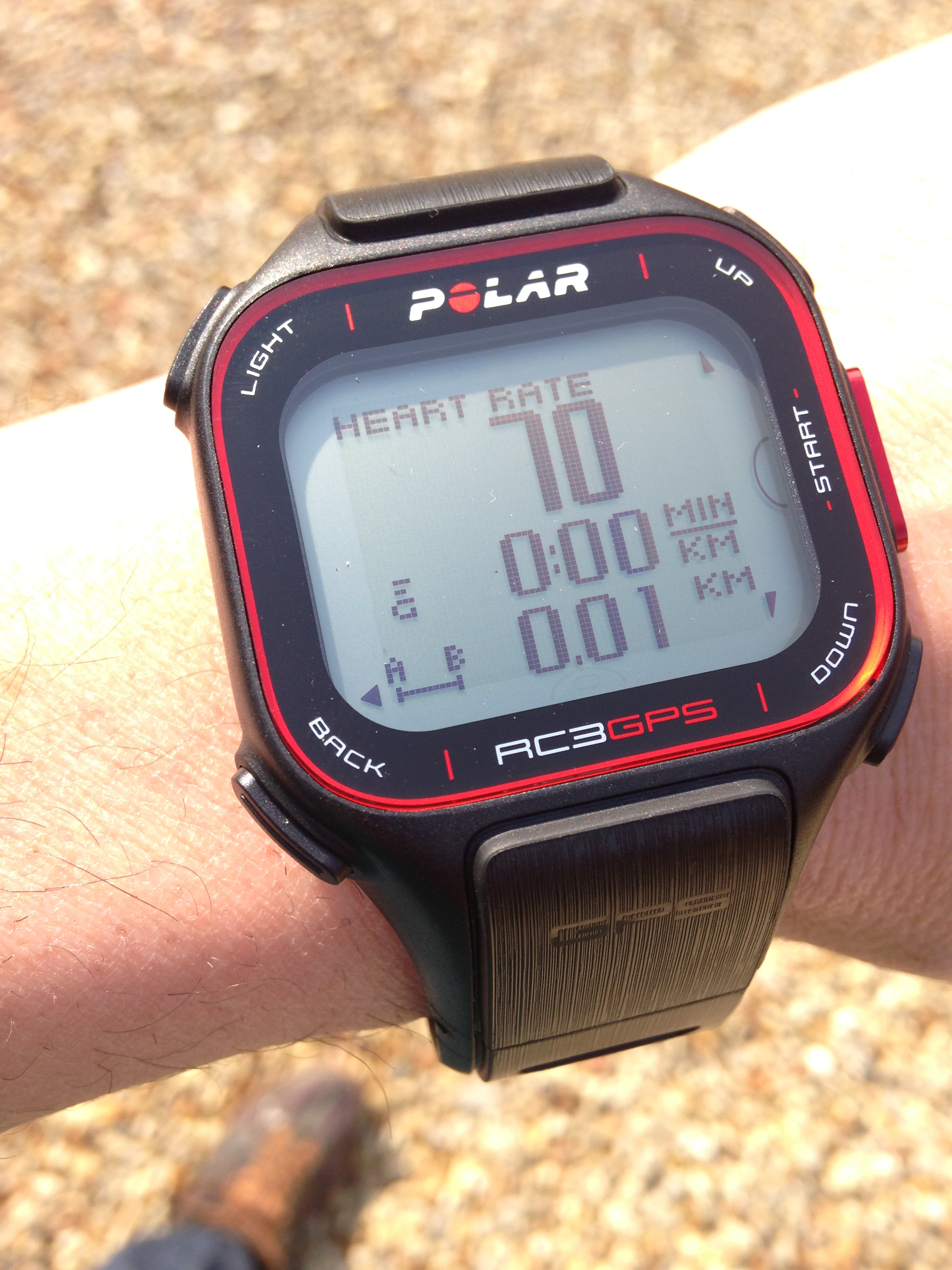
- Polar RC3 GPS heart rate monitor watch
- Subdivisions: Heart Rate Watch
- Specialist: Medical Technology
- Glossary: Medicine

A pulse watch, also known as a pulsometer or pulsograph, is an individual monitoring and measuring device with the ability to measure heart or pulse rate. Detection can occur in real time or can be saved and stored for later review. The pulse watch measures electrocardiography (ECG or EKG) data while the user is performing tasks, whether it be simple daily tasks or intense physical activity. The pulse watch functions without the use of wires and multiple sensors. This makes it useful in health and medical settings where wires and sensors may be an inconvenience. Use of the device is also common in sport and exercise environments where individuals are required to measure and monitor their biometric data.

== History ==
In the 17th century, physicians would diagnose diseases by observing external features like breathing patterns, feeling pulse and indications of pain and fevers.

The pulse watch was first made commercially available in 1701 by Sir John Floyer, who was an English physician. Floyer wanted to develop a watch to measure the accurate pulse rates of his patients. Floyer created a watch that counted a user's heart beat for sixty seconds, it created an easier way to count and measure the heart rate of patients. Floyers' designs were physically made by Samuel Watson, who was involved in horology in the late seventeenth century.

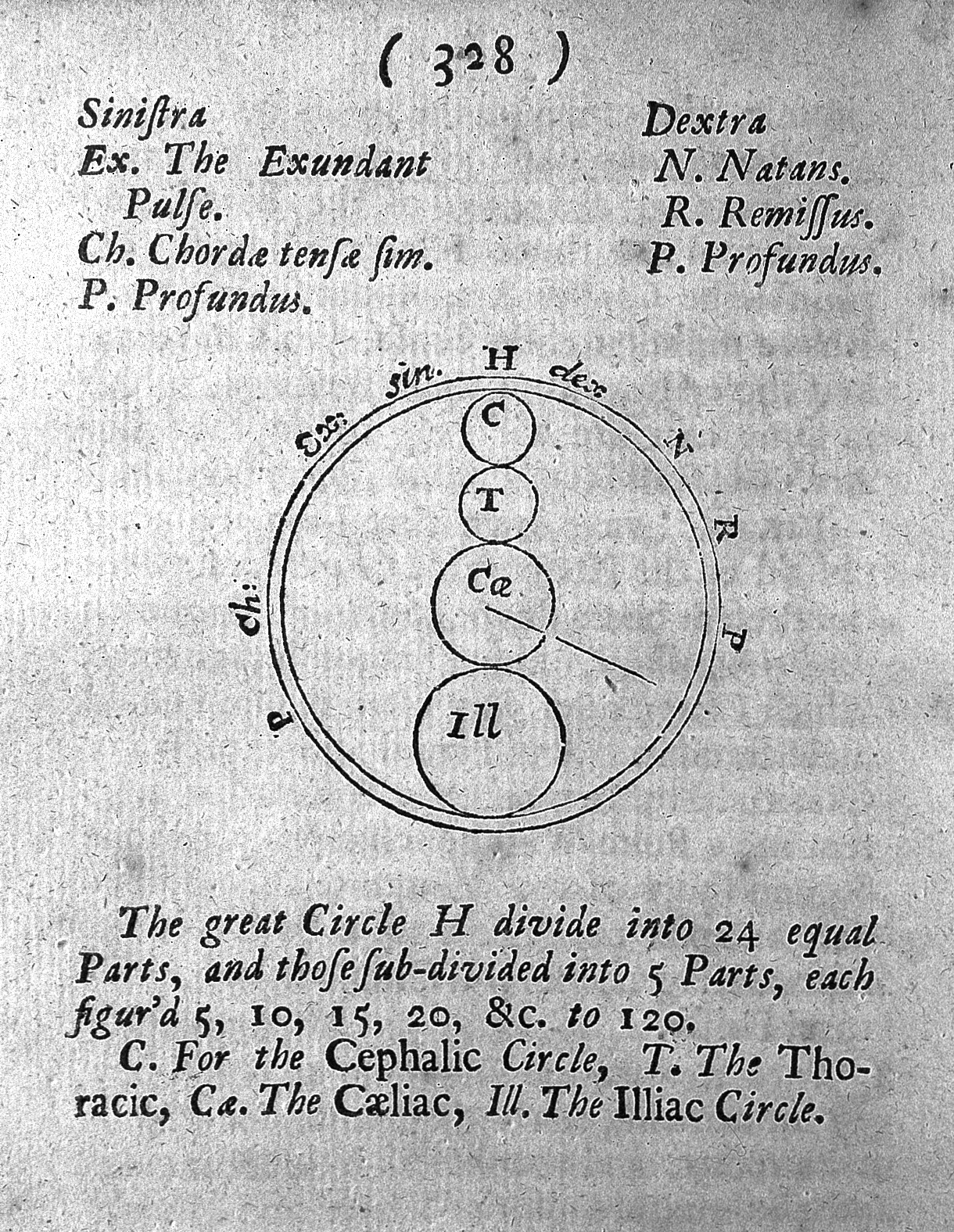
Floyers' original designs of a pulse watch

From this point onwards, physicians started to make medical observations based on the number of heart beats in a minute (bpm). The functions and mechanisms of the pulse watch were updated and redeveloped by many professionals throughout history. The use of pulse detecting devices have been implemented consistently by medical schools and facilities, as a form of medical technology, to accurately time the pulse and respiration of patients.

Since its commercial availability in 1707, the pulse watch gained the interest of many medical professionals. In the early 1920s, manufacturers from Switzerland incorporated scales, to improve the speed, accuracy and reliability of the device measuring a patient's pulse. Today, there is greater interest in smartwatch wearable devices due to their ability to perform many other biometric and technological functions aside from measuring pulse. Despite this, brands like Longines, Blancpain, Montblanc, and Vacheron Constantin still produce traditional pulse watches.

== Functions and mechanisms ==
A typical pulse watch device will use photoplethysmography (PPG), this methodology uses light and optical detectors to measure heart rate. Light emitting diodes (LEDs) and photodiodes, which are sensitive to light, measuring changes in light absorption in the body.

The four main technical mechanisms of pulse watches, used to measure heart rate include:

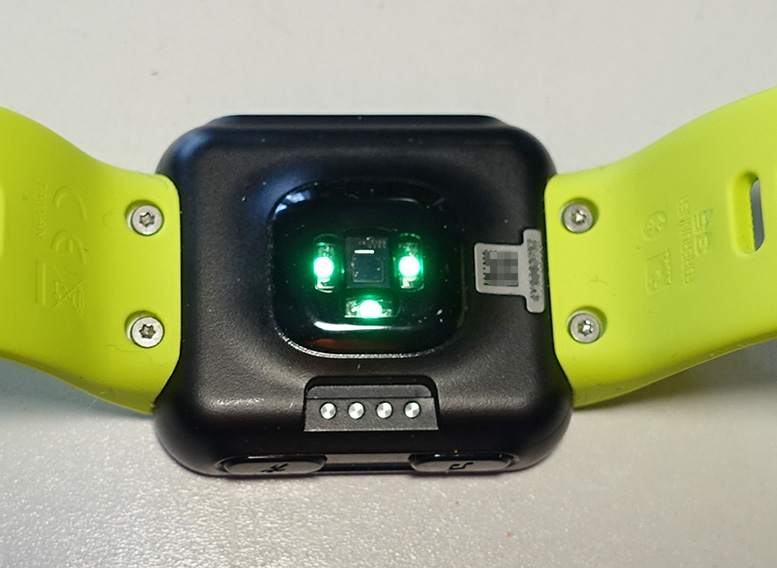
Green (LED) light displayed on modern pulse watch

1. Optical emitters — LEDs send coloured light waves into the skin. Due to the differences in users skin colour and thickness most modern pulse watches will include multiple light waves of different lengths to interact with different skin tones and thickness.

2. Processors — the processor of the pulse watch device will capture the light that is refracted from the user's device and will translate that into a binary code. This code is then transformed into meaningful pulse rate data.

3. Accelerometer — an accelerometer can measure any motion that is used in combination with the other mentioned components, providing motion and location sensing heart rate data via an algorithm

4. Algorithms — an algorithm is formed from the processor and the accelerometer into biometric data. Data such as blood pressure and calorie intake can also be provided to the user.

The device will measure the amount of blood that is flowing through the wrist at any chosen point in time by the user. Due to blood being red in colour, red light will be reflected by the body, and green light will be absorbed. A processor then transforms this light information into biometric data to be analysed by the user.

=== Accuracy ===
There have been concerns by users of the device measuring their heart rate at a consistent and continuous level, especially when in excessively motion. Many studies have assessed the accuracy levels of these wearable devices to measure and monitor heart rate and have found these devices to provide valid results to users. In one study 50 volunteers aged 18–32, continuously walked and ran on a treadmill for 30 minutes. Each participant manually checked their heart rate at each minute of the study. Results from the study show the pulse watch, reported some errors but still had a 95% accuracy level according to the study's analytical criteria. In another study, 25 participants engaged in different forms of physical activity; from standing to running. The study shows that the pulse watch device accurately detected the heart rate of users while standing, walking and jogging but produced some failures when the body was excessive motion during the running activities.

=== Types of monitoring devices ===
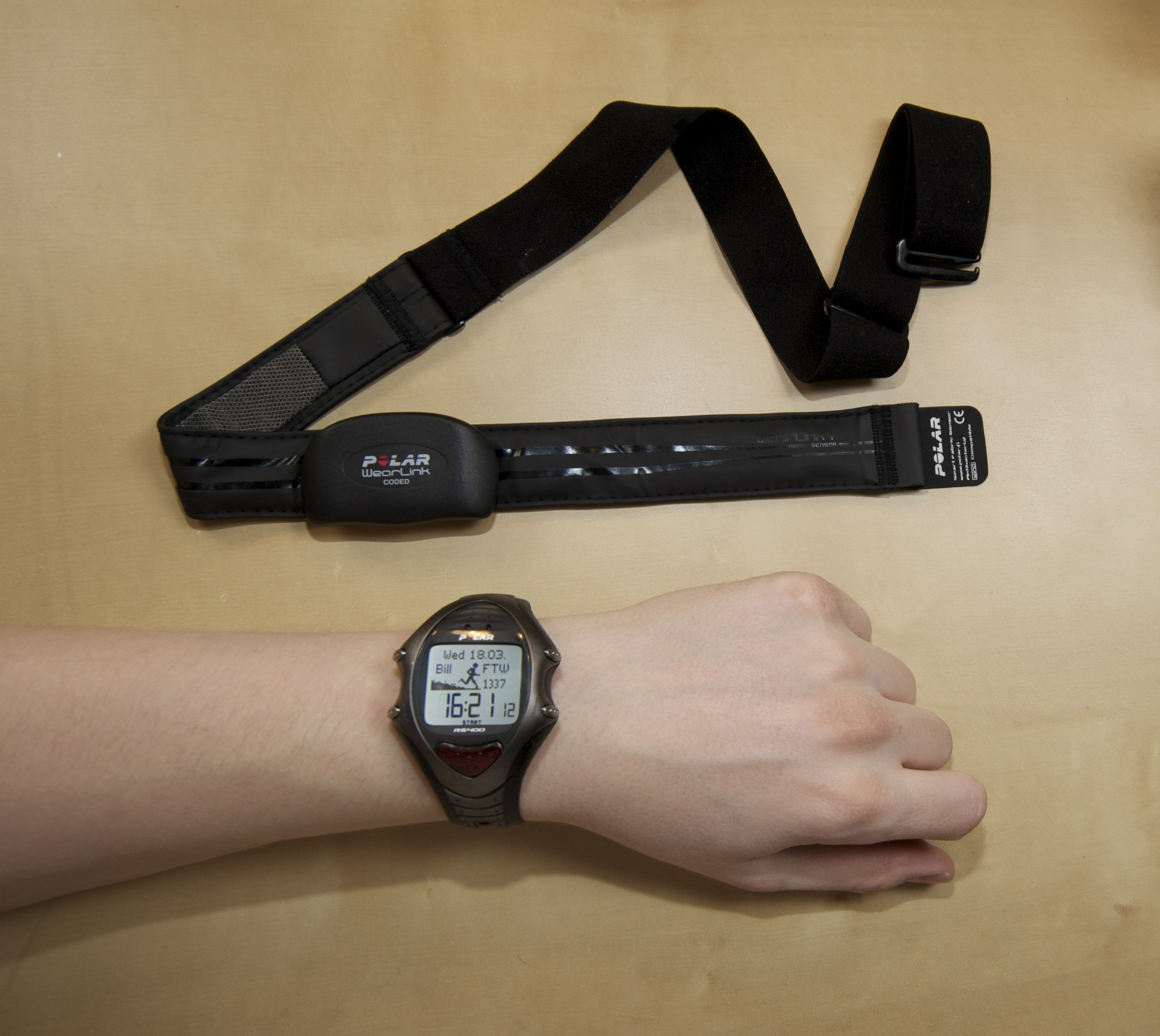
Heart rate monitor with chest strap and wrist watch display

Wearable technologies that monitor heart rate has interested users for a very long time. In addition to the pulse watch which monitors heart rate from pulse detection at the wrist. There are also devices which use similar technologies to monitor heart rate from the ear, forearm and chest, using a chest strap. All of which still use similar mechanisms to provide unobstructed biometric data for individuals. One study compared the use of a pulse watch device and a forearm device in detecting heart rate during physical activity. The results showed that the pulse watch device detected pulse with less failures during activities like walking and running. In more rigorous activities like cycling, the forearm device provided more accurate heart rate information. The study concludes that the accuracy of the monitoring device may be affected by its placement and proximity to the parts of the body engaged in the most physical activity.

== Current and future uses ==
=== Current uses ===
Pulse watches are utilised on a daily basis by a wide range of people, this is due to the vast availability and accessibility to the device. Pulse watch devices are used in the medical industry where a transcript of user's heart rate data over a period of time can be stored and automatically sent to the user's physician. This is also the case where calorie intake and physical activity levels of users can be stored and sent to their physicians for the purpose of weight management. Wearable devices which use pulse watch mechanisms are also used in the management of patient health. The ability of these devices to efficiently monitor and store health data, provides a solution for patients who require ongoing self-management to monitor the progression of the illness. One study created a data recording system for participants with type-1 diabetes, using these wearable devices. Participants used the device to track their daily intake of carbohydrates, their insulin and blood glucose levels and their amount of physical activity. The results of the study found that the use of these wearable wrist devices provided a simple way for patients to monitor the requirements of their health challenges.

Pulse watches are also heavily used in the sport and exercise industry. Coaches and health professionals may want to monitor and analyse an athlete's physical activities. A clinical review found that the use of wearable devices in athlete monitoring, has a significant impact on the improvement of performance. Wearable devices that produce biometric data like heart rate, motion and positioning, body temperature and sleep, allow for real-time information to be collated and analysed by professionals. This may allow patterns between individual behaviours and performance to be made, allowing for the creation of personalised training programs for athletes. The use of these wearable devices can also detect potential causes of injury such as, a lack of sleep from an athlete, leading to fatigue during training.

==== In popular culture ====
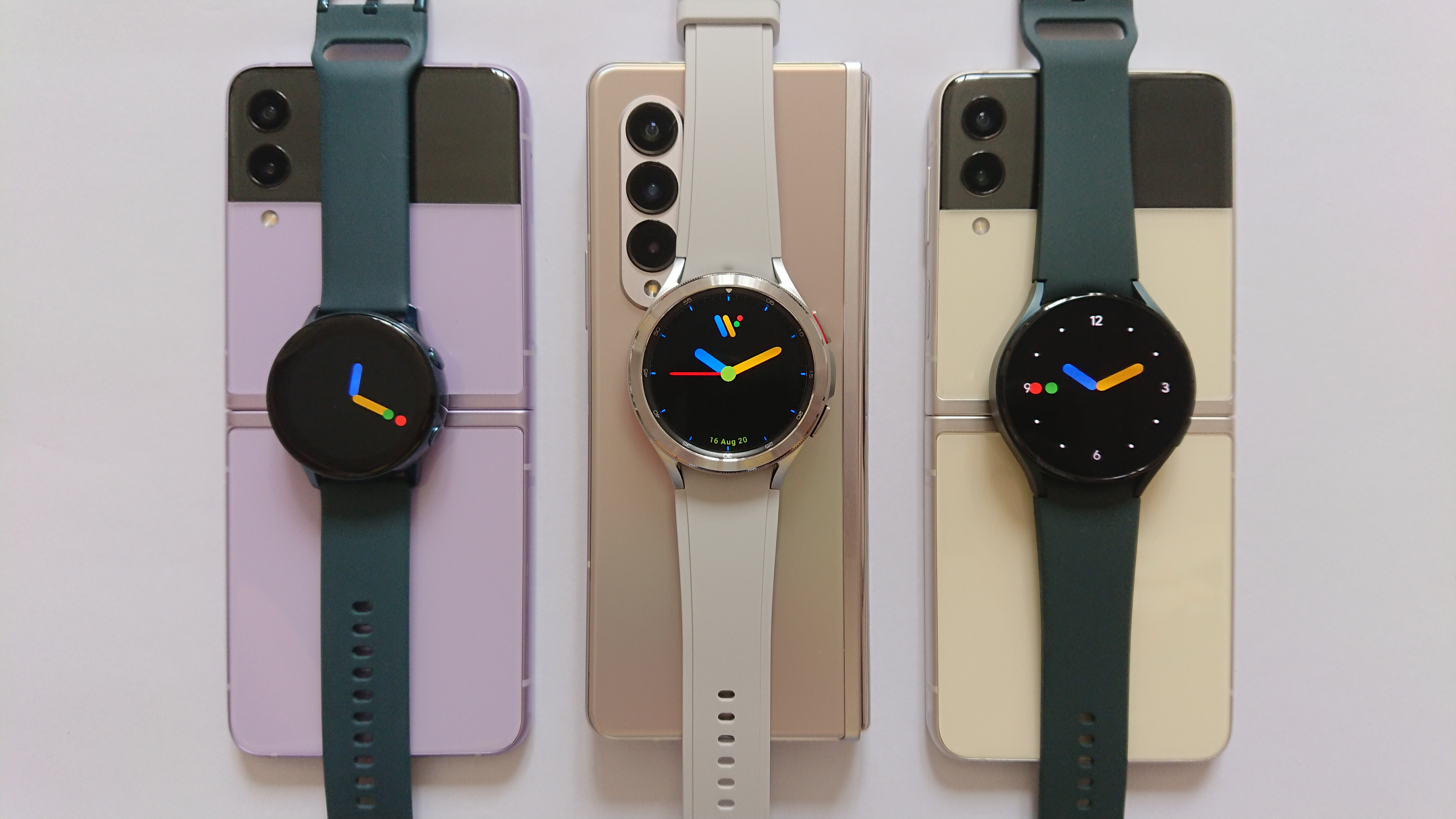
Example of Wear OS smartwatches - Samsung Galaxy Watch

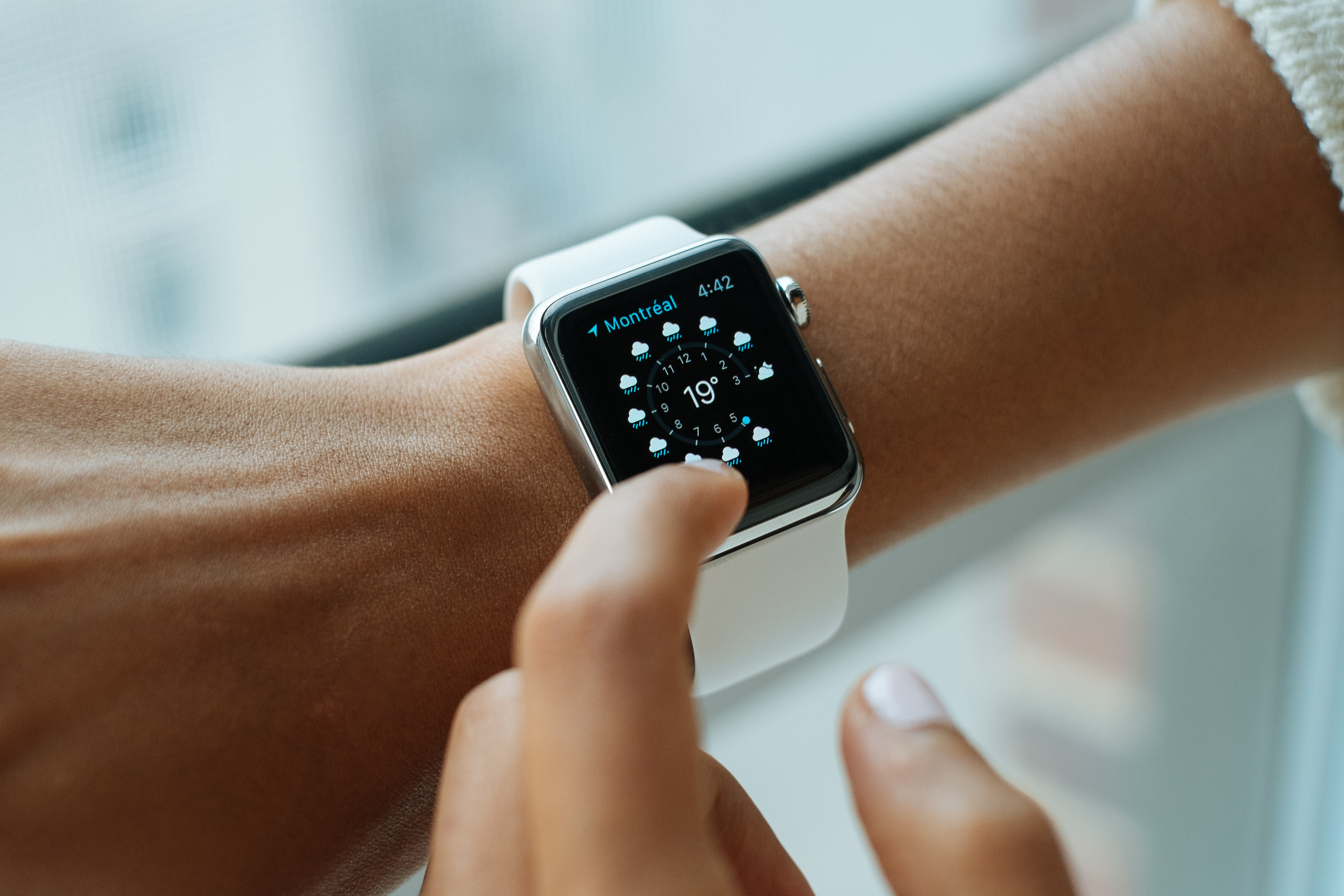
Example of a watchOS smartwatch - Apple Watch

Brand names like Apple, Samsung, Fitbit and Garmin have incorporated the use of pulse watch devices into their product line. Celebrities and other influential people in the media, will often be seen wearing a pulse watch device, marketing the devices to users. Much of the appeal of wearable devices like pulse watches, comes from brands creating a social dimension associated with the device. The addition of interactive applications on these devices, maintains the engagement levels of users allowing the device to be used more frequently by the user. After decades of technological advancements and improvements, it is expected that one in ten US adults now own a smartwatch. The wearable device industry is also expected to grow in sales by 20% over the next 5 years.

=== Future uses ===
The mechanisms and uses of the pulse watch are constantly being upgraded as our understanding of technology increases. Some future applications include; utilising the current pulse watch mechanisms, but applying them to wireless foot skates and skate boards to allow for biometrics like speed traveled and heart rate to be monitored through users, without any physical contact. As well as, upgrading some of the mechanisms in the pulse watch to not just detect pulse but to detect abnormal symptoms in users, that may signal medical abnormalities.

Wearable devices that use the pulse watch detection mechanisms are being considered as a tool that can be used for occupational risk assessment. There is a potential for the existing technical mechanisms in this devices, like motion detection, to be further developed. The development of these mechanisms may allow for wearable devices to be able to detect workplace falls, exposure to noise, temperature changes, light and vibrations, the exposure to certain chemical agents and detection of hazards using sensors. The use of wearable devices in the workplace may provide a functional way to make work spaces safer.

== Evaluation ==
The original design of the pulse watch has undergone major development since 1707. With modern advancements in technology, the pulse watch which could once only read a users' pulse rate has progressed into a smart device capable of much more. The advancements of these devices have allowed for specific health related behaviours to be counteracted with the use of these technologies. Smokewatch, a smartwatch company is designing a watch used to aid in the process of smoking cessation. The designed watch has the capability to detect when users smoke and monitor the reoccurrence of smoking at specific points in time. It can then notify the user on information like the amounts being spent on cigarettes. The watch can also tabulate this information and store it for desired lengths of time.

Some devices allow for personal health data may be sent to health practitioners, of the users choice, in order to monitor their progression of health. The security and privacy levels of some of these wearable devices are being considered by some users as they have the ability to hold and distribute sensitive health information. One study analysed the security and privacy levels of wearable devices. The study found that there were specific aspects where users of wearable devices may be vulnerable to privacy breaches; this includes the storage and transmission of unencrypted data, a lack of physical security controls and a lack of authentication and authorisation by the user. There is a need to develop strong authentication mechanisms in wearable technologies so prevent losses of security and confidentiality in users.

== See also ==
- Medical technology
- eHealth
- Heart rate monitor
- Smartwatch
- Pedometer
- Apple Watch
- Activity tracker
