= Nathalie Evans =

- Born: Sarah Nathalie Evans; 12 June 1918; Sutton Coldfield, Warwickshire
- Died: 9 September 2016 (aged 98)
- Occupations: Businesswoman and conservationist
- Known for: Co-founder of Twycross Zoo

Sarah Nathalie Evans (12 June 1918 – 9 September 2016) was an English businesswoman and conservationist with a particular interest in primates. In 1963 she co-founded the Twycross Zoo, Leicestershire. She began her career as a dog breeder and pet shop owner before merging her business with that of rival Molly Badham. The pair kept primates in their shared flat before moving, in 1954, to a larger house in Hints, Staffordshire where they established the Hints Zoological Gardens. Evans and Badham trained their chimpanzees to act out tea parties, which was noticed by the Brooke Bond tea company, who contracted the animals for a series of television advertisements for the PG Tips brand. After outgrowing Hints the pair moved their collection to Twycross, Leicestershire where they developed the largest primate collection outside of Japan. The Twycross Zoo became the first in the United Kingdom to breed colobus monkeys and bonobos and is now recognised as the World Primate Centre.

== Early life ==
Sarah Nathalie Evans was born in Sutton Coldfield, Warwickshire, on 12 June 1918. Her father was a Royal Air Force engineer and veteran of the First World War. Evans bred dachshunds for dog shows and began selling some of the animals, which allowed her to set up a pet shop in her home town. By the 1940s Molly Badham had established a rival pet shop in the town. In 1949 Evans sold a woolly monkey to Badham for £35 (equivalent to £1,562 in 2023), the first in a long line of primates the pair would look after together. Evans and Badham soon entered into a professional partnership, consolidating their businesses. The pair lived together above the pet shop in Sutton Coldfield and kept chimpanzees in the flat, among the first of which were two called Sue and Mickey, who were trained to eat at the dinner table and use the toilet. On one occasion Evans and Badham returned to the flat to find that the animals had thrown many of their personal belongings out of the window and into the street below. The pair became well known among veterinarians for taking in injured or unwanted exotic animals and soon had a sizeable menagerie. Evans and Badham looked after Chudleigh, a chimpanzee belonging to the naturalist Gerald Durrell, while he was out of the country for a year.

== Hints and PG Tips ==
Evans and Badham moved to Hints, Staffordshire in 1954, buying a house which they developed into Hints Zoological Gardens. A craze for chimps as pets in the 1950s left them with many animals from owners who could not cope with them. During a visit to London Zoo they witnessed a chimpanzees' tea party, a form of entertainment in which chimpanzees are dressed up in human clothes and provided with food and drink, which inspired them to recreate the experience at Hints. They were soon afterwards approached by the tea company Brooke Bond, who wanted to put on a chimpanzees' tea party at an event at Olympia London to promote their PG Tips brand. This was very successful, and the company booked the chimpanzees for a series of television advertisements that ran from 1956.

Evans helped facilitate the use of the chimps by negotiating the appearance fees and contracts while Badham trained the animals. Animal rights activists criticised the advertisements as exploiting the chimps in an unnatural setting, and Brooke Bond cancelled them in 1968. However, Evans and Badham claimed the chimpanzees enjoyed performing and, after sales of PG Tips fell, the advertisements were reinstated. The chimpanzees were also in high demand on television programmes such as Blue Peter and Tiswas, for appearances at shop openings, and even for film roles such as in a Hammer Horror picture with Peter Cushing. Badham and Evans came to accept that the activity exploited the animals, ceased the tea parties at their premises, and ended involvement with Brooke Bond in 1977. PG Tips continued to feature chimpanzees, sourced from other trainers, in their television advertisements until 2002.

== Twycross Zoo ==
Hints was overwhelmed by the number of visitors it received, and the escape of a large antelope into a nearby orchard caused bad relations with their neighbours. Evans and Badham decided to move to larger premises and, partly with revenue from Brooke Bond, purchased a Victorian house and 12 acres (4.9 ha) of land near Twycross, Leicestershire. This was opened as Twycross Zoo in 1963. The Brooke Bond money helped to fund Twycross' conservation programmes that led to the first colobus monkey to be born in the United Kingdom, in 1969, and the first bonobo in 1994. It also funded the first studbooks, essential for safe breeding, for gibbons and chimps.

The zoo expanded over the following years with former farm buildings converted into enclosures and neighbouring land purchased. The zoo was reorganised with ownership granted to the East Midlands Zoological Society, a charitable trust founded by Evans and Badgham, in 1972. The zoo became renowned as a centre for the care of endangered animals, with successes including a bow-legged former circus lion and an otter injured in a fight. Its particular specialism was primates, with Evans and Badham recognised as experts in the field, and it developed the largest collection of these animals anywhere outside of Japan. It is now recognised as the World Primate Centre.

Evans was a member of the International Union of Directors of Zoological Gardens (now known as the World Association of Zoos and Aquariums) and a founding member, in 1966, of the National Federation of Zoological Gardens of Great Britain and Ireland (now known as the British and Irish Association of Zoos and Aquariums). Evans collaborated with Badham (and writer Maureen Lawless) to write two books documenting their lives and the foundation of Twycross Zoo: Chimps with Everything (1979) and Molly's Zoo (2000). Evans and Badham continued to hand-rear abandoned chimpanzees in their house until 2000 but retired from the zoo in 2004. Badham died in 2007 and Evans died on 9 September 2016.
