= Luke Evans (politician) =

British Conservative politician

Dr Luke Evans MP
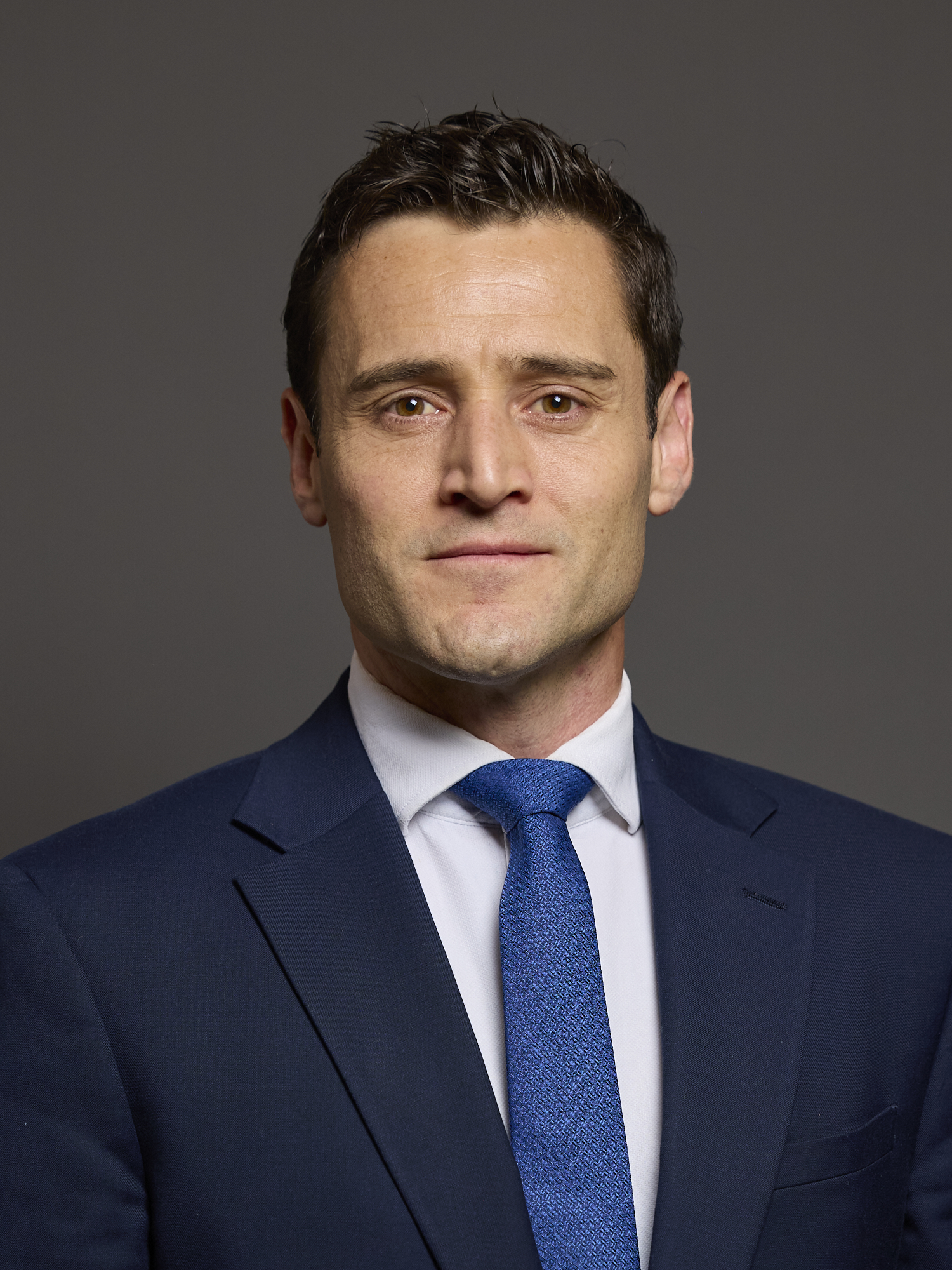
- Official portrait, 2024

Shadow Minister for Energy Security and Net Zero
- Incumbent
- Assumed office 31 August 2026
- Leader: Kemi Badenoch
- Preceded by: Greg Smith

Shadow Minister for Health and Social Care
- In office 5 November 2024 – 31 August 2026 Serving with Caroline Johnson
- Leader: Kemi Badenoch
- Preceded by: John Whittingdale
- Succeeded by: Neil Shastri-Hurst and Greg Stafford

Shadow Minister for Media, Creative Industries and Tourism
- In office 19 July 2024 – 5 November 2024
- Leader: Rishi Sunak; Kemi Badenoch
- Preceded by: Chris Bryant
- Succeeded by: Saqib Bhatti

Opposition Whip
- In office 19 July 2024 – 5 November 2024
- Leader: Rishi Sunak; Kemi Badenoch

Member of Parliament for Hinckley and Bosworth Bosworth (2019–2024)
- Incumbent
- Assumed office 12 December 2019
- Preceded by: David Tredinnick
- Majority: 5,408 (11.3%)

Personal details
- Born: 10 January 1983 (age 43) Dorset, England
- Party: Conservative
- Spouse: Charlotte March (m. 2019)
- Children: 1 - Eva Morgan Evans
- Education: University of Birmingham
- Website: drlukeevans.org.uk

Luke Evans (born 10 January 1983) is a British Conservative Party politician and former general practitioner who has served as the Member of Parliament (MP) for Hinckley and Bosworth, previously Bosworth, since 2019.

== Early life and medical career ==
Luke Evans was born on 10 January 1983 and brought up in Dorset; his father is a GP, and his mother was a nurse and then a school nurse. Evans began studying at the University of Birmingham Medical School in 2002, and qualified as a doctor in 2007. Evans worked in hospitals across the Midlands whilst he was a junior doctor and described his training as "one of the most difficult, yet proudest, periods of [his] career", saying the "profound difference you can make to a patient's life" is a "real privilege".

In 2009, Evans returned to the University of Birmingham to teach anatomy, and began training to become a GP.

Evans qualified as a GP in 2013, and worked as a GP full-time until he was elected in December 2019.

== Parliamentary career ==
Evans stood as the Conservative candidate in Birmingham Edgbaston at the 2015 general election, coming second with 38.3% of the vote behind the incumbent Labour MP Gisela Stuart.

He supported the UK leaving the EU in the 2016 UK EU membership referendum.

In September 2019, Evans was selected as the Conservative candidate for Bosworth. At the 2019 general election, Evans was elected to Parliament as MP for Bosworth with 63.9% of the vote and a majority of 26,278.

Since February 2020, Evans has gained a following on TikTok showing his day-to-day activities as a Member of Parliament and provides explanations on various political processes.

Evans served as a member of the Health and Social Care Select Committee between March 2020 and December 2022.

In September 2020, Evans introduced a Private Member's Bill under the Ten Minute Rule, entitled the Digitally Altered Body Images Bill. If enacted into law, the bill would require advertisers to label images which have been digitally altered.

In February 2021, Evans suggested that mental health practitioners should be stationed at coronavirus vaccine centres.

Evans formally recommended Twycross Zoo's project for a National Science and Conservation Centre in summer 2021, which will be built in his constituency, to receive funding from the Levelling Up Scheme. In the autumn 2021 budget, the chancellor Rishi Sunak announced the bid had been successful, with £19.9 million allocated to Twycross Zoo.

In October 2021, Evans launched a new campaign asking the Government to recognise the issue of body image for the first time in UK law, in the Online Safety Bill.

Throughout autumn 2021, Evans raised the issue of the 15-minute wait after receiving a Pfizer or Moderna coronavirus vaccine, asking the Government if the data could be reviewed. Evans said in Parliament on 8 December that dropping the wait, if safe to do so, would "free up a huge amount of capacity when it comes to delivering the boosters". The chief and deputy chief medical officers for the UK subsequently announced that having reviewed the data, it was safe to suspend the 15-minute wait in order to allow as many people as possible to receive a booster vaccine, and that retaining the wait presented more of a risk than dropping it. Prime Minister Boris Johnson confirmed in Parliament on 15 December that the 15-minute wait would be dropped.

In January 2022, Evans launched a podcast, Dr in the House, which covers topics like "mental health, body image and life as an MP" with "fellow MPs, famous faces and just some of the extraordinary people he comes across in his job". Speakers on the podcast include James McVey, Dr Alex George and former-CEO of Twycross Zoo (situated within Evans's constituency of Bosworth), Sharon Redrobe OBE.

On 13 June 2022, Evans was appointed Parliamentary Private Secretary (PPS) to the Home Office ministerial team, alongside Matt Vickers.

Evans endorsed Penny Mordaunt in the July–September 2022 Conservative Party leadership election and, after her defeat, voted for Rishi Sunak. He also endorsed Mordaunt in the October 2022 election but welcomed Sunak stating: "I supported Rishi's choices as Chancellor during the Covid pandemic and the level of support for all households, but particularly pensioners and the most vulnerable, announced in May to assist with cost of living pressures. Rishi has my full support moving forward".

Evans is a noted supporter of artificial intelligence. In 2022, he was the first parliamentarian in history to deliver a speech in Parliament written entirely by AI. In 2025, he was involved with a pilot programme for MPs to use Microsoft Copilot. Speaking about his decision to take part in the pilot programme, Evans said he would be worried if anyone was using it to “outsource either opinions or ideas to a computer." He went on to state that "AI is there and should be looked at and explored. The question from an MP’s point of view is how do you do this safely and make sure that people are protected, that data is protected.”

On the NFU's Back British Farming Day 2023, 13 September, the Food and Farming Secretary Thérèse Coffey and the UK Government endorsed Evans's 'Buy British' campaign. This followed a petition by the National Farmers Union (NFU) in support of Evans's campaign which received over 25,000 signatures in only six days.

In February 2024 Evans appeared on Good Morning Britain alongside TOWIE star James Lock to discuss his body image campaign and the impact of body dysmorphic disorder, quoting a survey which showed that "1 in 5 adults and 1 in 3 children feel shame about their body".

In April 2024 Evans was nominated as Pagefield's Parliamentary Campaigner of the Year, losing out on the award to Lord Arbuthnot for his work to overturn the wrongful convictions of sub-postmasters and highlight the Post Office Horizon scandal.

Due to the 2023 Periodic Review of Westminster constituencies, Evans' constituency of Bosworth was renamed to Hinckley and Bosworth. At the 2024 general election, Evans was elected to Parliament as MP for Hinckley and Bosworth with 35.6% of the vote and a majority of 5,408.

Evans secured his Hinckley and Bosworth Seat in the election and after the defeat of the Conservative Party, he was appointed shadow Parliamentary Under-Secretary of State for Culture, Media and Sport and an Opposition Whip in the interim opposition frontbench of Rishi Sunak.

In November 2024, Evans was made Shadow Health Minister for Primary Care and Social Care in Kemi Badenoch's Shadow Cabinet.

== Personal life ==
In May 2019, Evans married fellow GP Dr Charlotte March; they first met whilst they were both at medical school. They live in the Hinckley and Bosworth constituency. Evans is the eldest of three brothers, all of whom have gone into medicine.

In November 2026, Evans announced the birth of his first child.

In 2017, Evans became British Public Speaking Champion. He also played rugby during and after university, sang in a competitive barbershop chorus, was a Rotarian, and served as a primary school governor.

Evans volunteered to help administer the coronavirus vaccine in Bosworth in summer 2021.

In April 2024 Evans revealed he had been targeted, as part of the honeypot scam centred around William Wragg, having received unsolicited messages on WhatsApp. Evans immediately reported both sets of messages to Metropolitan Police, Leicestershire Police and Parliamentary Security – blowing the whistle on the spear phishing targeting of MPs. Evans has since praised Leicestershire Police for their support but expressed concerns around Parliament's handling of the situation.

Parliament of the United Kingdom
| Preceded by David Tredinnick | Member of Parliament for Bosworth; 2019–2024 | Constituency abolished |
| New constituency | Member of Parliament for Hinckley and Bosworth; 2024–present | Incumbent |
