= Shadow Minister for Media, Creative Industries and Tourism =

Position of the British shadow cabinet

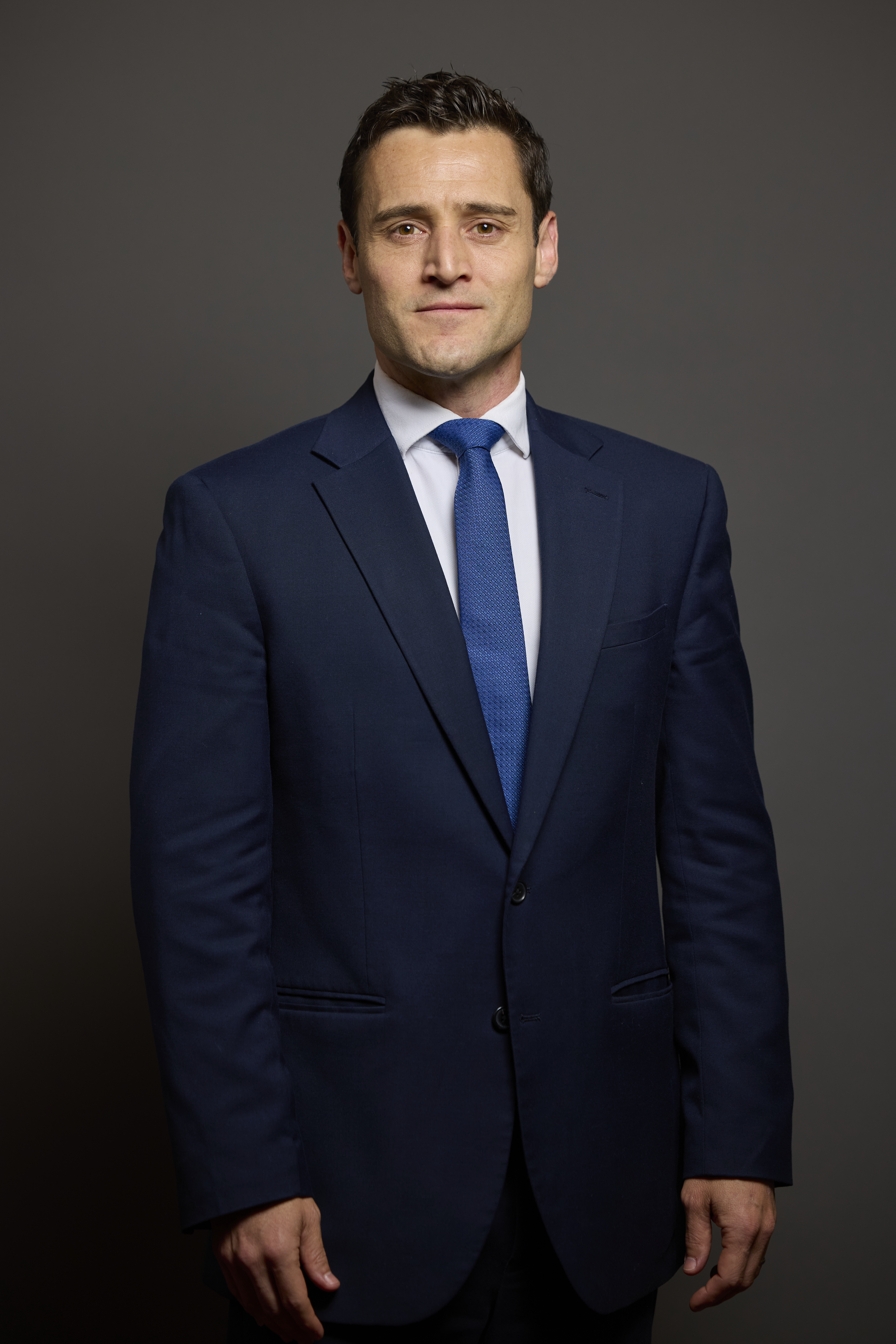
- Incumbent; Luke Evans since 8 July 2024
- Style: Shadow Minister (informal)
- Member of: Official Opposition frontbench
- Appointer: Leader of the Opposition

The Shadow Minister for Media, Creative Industries and Tourism is a junior role in His Majesty's Most Loyal Opposition in the United Kingdom, shadowing the Department for Culture, Media and Sport. It is held by Dr Luke Evans MP since July 2024.

== See also ==
- Official Opposition frontbench
- Secretary of State for Culture, Media and Sport
- Department for Culture, Media and Sport
