= Hints, Staffordshire =

Village in Staffordshire, England

Coordinates: 52.625°N 1.768°W

Hints
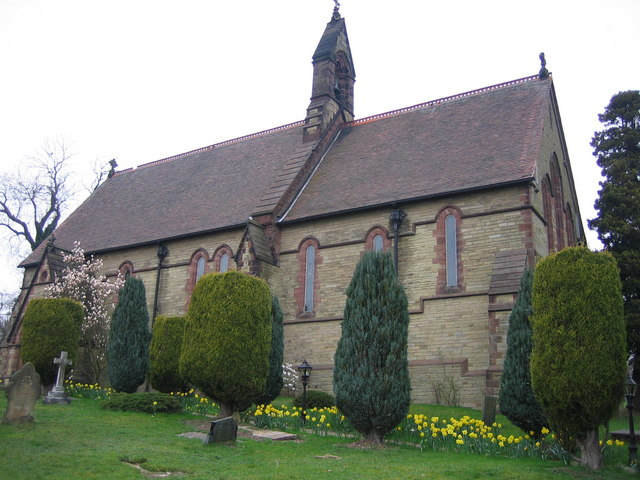
- St Bartholomew's Church

- Location within Staffordshire
- Population: 355 (2011)
- OS grid reference: SK1503
- Civil parish: Hints
- District: Lichfield
- Shire county: Staffordshire
- Region: West Midlands
- Country: England
- Sovereign state: United Kingdom
- Post town: TAMWORTH
- Postcode district: B78
- Dialling code: 01543/0121
- Police: Staffordshire
- Fire: Staffordshire
- Ambulance: West Midlands
- UK Parliament: Tamworth
- Website: hintswithcanwellparishcouncil.gov.uk

Hints is a village and civil parish in the Lichfield district of Staffordshire, England. The parish includes the village of Canwell. In 2011 the parish had a population of 355.

== Geography ==
Hints lies 3 miles (5 km) west of Tamworth, 5 miles (8 km) southeast of Lichfield and 5 miles (8.0 km) northeast of Sutton Coldfield.

The village is located along Watling Street, which was formerly the A5, but the A5 now runs in a cutting north of the village. The name of the parish council is Hints with Canwell. The parish church is dedicated to St Bartholomew. The centre of Hints is situated 200 metres north of Bourne Brook (a.k.a. Black Brook), a western tributary of the River Tame, and nearby villages include Hopwas, Weeford and Drayton Bassett.

On 1 April 1934 the parish of Canwell was abolished and merged with Hints.

== Toponymy ==
The name Hints appears to derive from the Welsh word hynt, meaning 'a road' (referring to Watling Street). This suggests that Welsh speakers occupied the area until at least the late 6th century, when most of the Midlands had been occupied by the English.

== Twycross Zoo ==
Twycross Zoo was founded in 1963 by pet shop owners Molly Badham and Nathalie Evans, after the pair's increasing zoological collection outgrew their three-quarter-acre site in Hints.

== Notable people ==
- John Floyer (1649–1734), a physician and author.
- John Floyer (c. 1681–1762) son of the above and politician, MP for Tamworth
