= Canwell =

Village in Staffordshire, England

Coordinates: 52.596183°N 1.791331°W

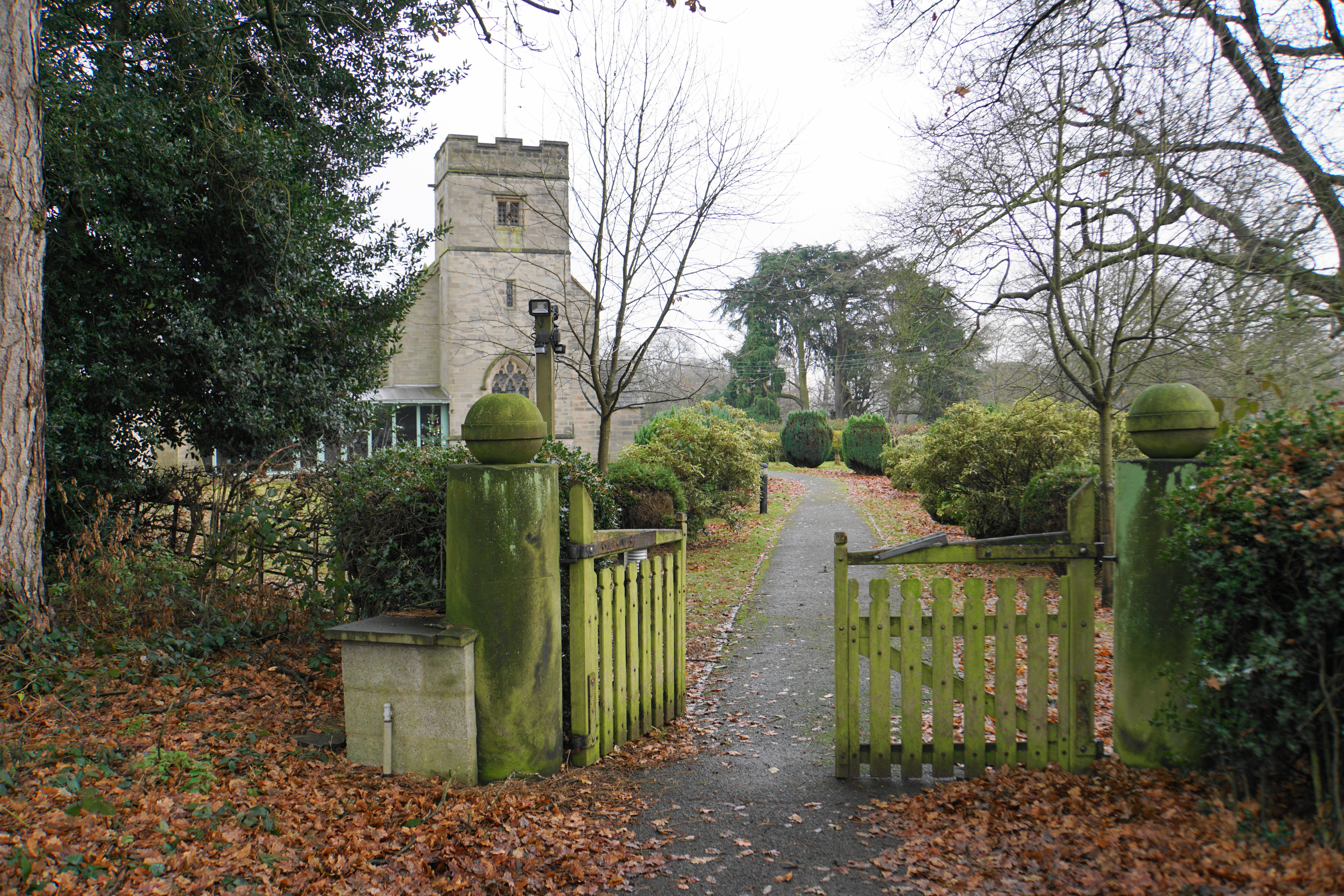
- Canwell parish church.

- Location within Staffordshire
- Civil parish: Hints
- District: Lichfield
- Shire county: Staffordshire
- Region: West Midlands
- Country: England
- Sovereign state: United Kingdom
- Post town: Sutton Coldfield
- Postcode district: B75
- Police: Staffordshire
- Fire: Staffordshire
- Ambulance: West Midlands
- UK Parliament: Tamworth

Canwell is a village in the civil parish of Hints, in the Lichfield district, in the county of Staffordshire, England. It is close to the town of Sutton Coldfield, forming part of the Staffordshire/City of Birmingham boundary.

== History ==
The name origin of "Canwell" is uncertain and may mean 'Cana's spring' or 'cup spring'.

Canwell was mentioned in the Imperial Gazetteer of England and Wales 1870-72, where it was described and quote:

Canwell, an extra-parochial tract in Tamworth district, Stafford; on the verge of the county, 5 miles SW of Tamworth. Acres, 290. Real property, £681. Pop., 43. Houses, 7. Canwell Hall is the seat of Sir F. Lawley, Bart. A Benedictine priory was founded here in 1142, by Geva, daughter of Hugh Lupus; and given, at the dissolution, to Cardinal Wolsey.

— John Marius Wilson, History of Canwell, in Lichfield and Staffordshire

Canwell was in South Offlow hundred.

In 1858 Canwell became a civil parish, in 1894 Camwell became part of Tamworth Rural District, on 1 October 1896 part of Drayton Bassett parish was transferred to Canwell, on 1 April 1934 the parish was abolished and merged with Hints and became part of Lichfield Rural District. At the 1931 census (the last before the abolition of the parish), Canwell had a population of 243. In 1974 Canwell became part of Lichfield non-metropolitan district in the non-metropolitan county of Staffordshire.

== Canwell Priory and Hall ==
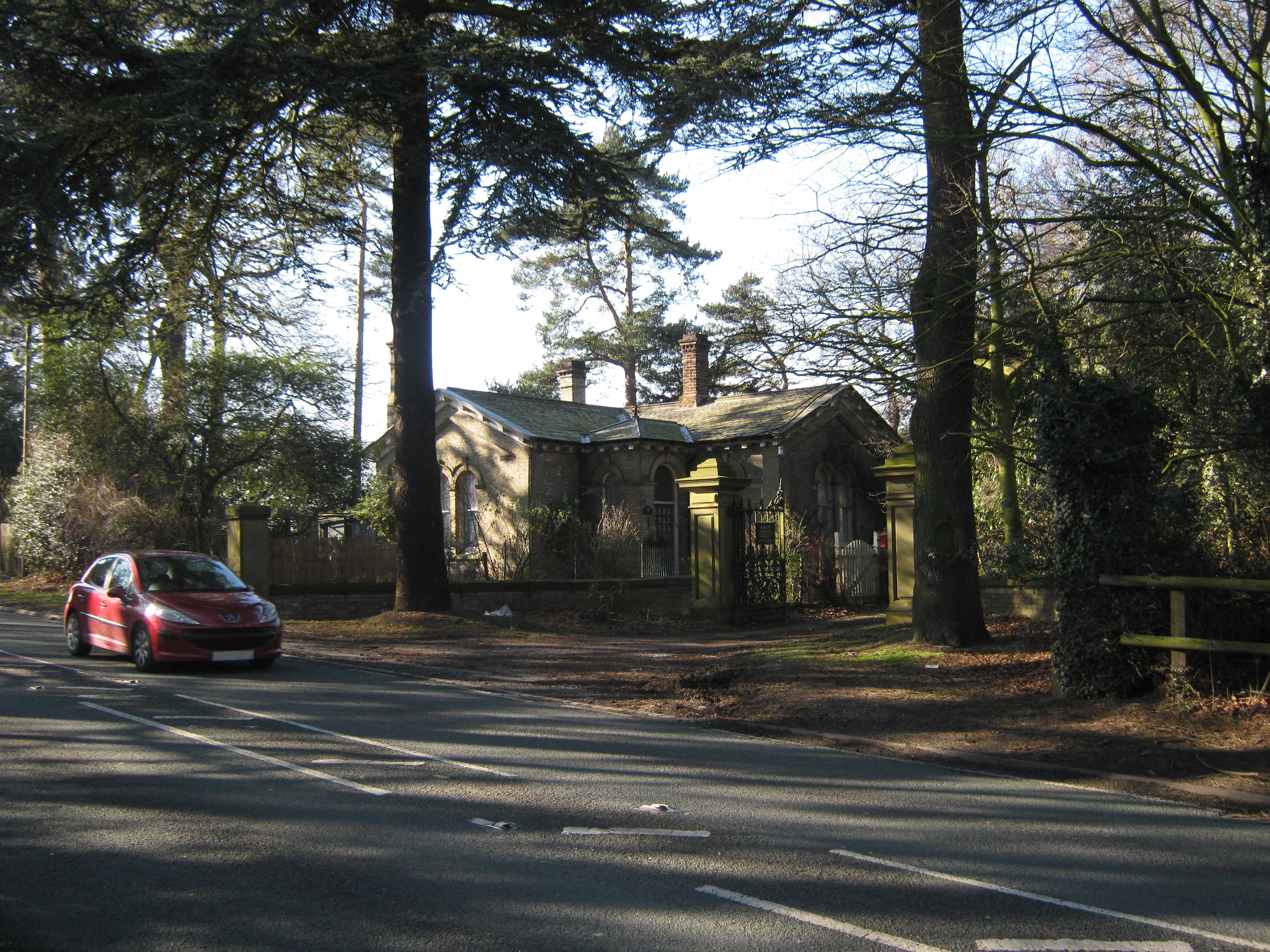
The old gatehouse towards Canwell Hall

Canwell was once home to Canwell Priory which was mentioned back in 1524 and 1527. Although the priory was a small, early Augustinian priory which was dissolved in 1530. Bishop Vesey later acquired the priory site before it was later purchased by the Lawley family. They demolished the priory and its buildings where they constructed Canwell Hall. Prior to its demolition, the priory was said to have been so small that only one monk could reside there at any time. Canwell Hall is now a private estate.

== Village centre ==
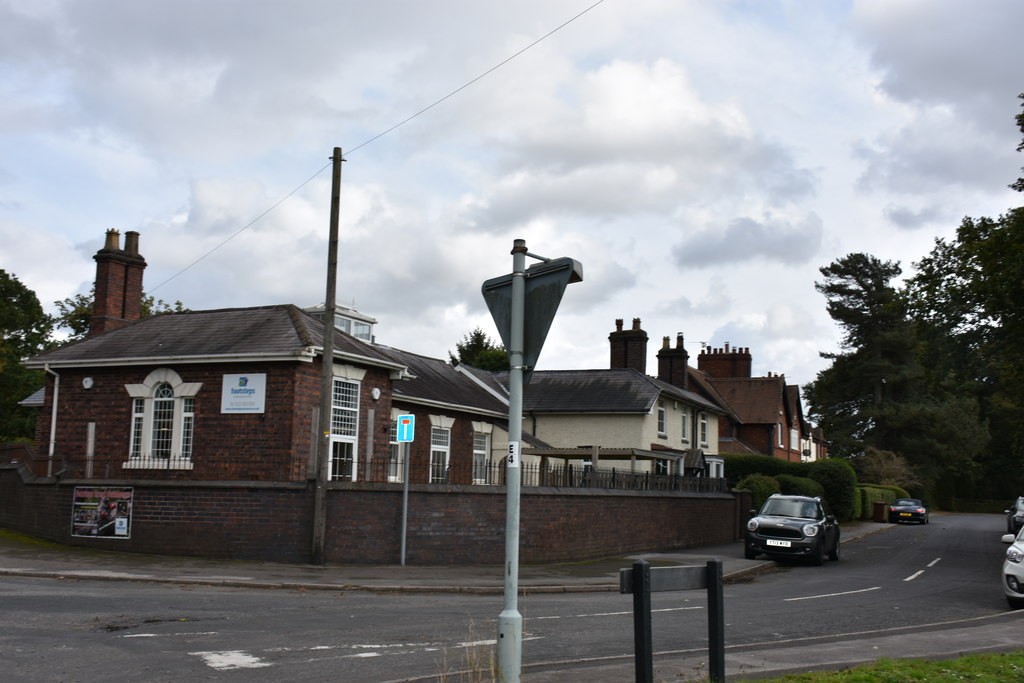
Footsteps Canwell Nursery & Pre-School, Slade Road, Canwell

Canwell village centre is situated along London Road and part of Brockhurst Lane. Some places of note in the village centre include:

- The Priory - A mixed use business park.
- Quinney Hall - An events venue.
- Footsteps Canwell Nursery & Pre-School - A nursery and pre school.
- Carroway Cottage - A small office.
- Buzzard Valley Vineyard & Shop - A mixed use establishment with dog parks, fishing lakes, nature trail, vineyard, farm shop and more.
- Canwell Show - An agricultural show.

== Transport ==
Canwell has no bus services, with the nearest bus stops located in nearby Bassetts Pole, which is served by Arriva bus number 110, nicknamed "Sapphire". The stops are located on both the A453 and Fox Hill Road. The nearest rail stations to the village are Blake Street, Butlers Lane and Four Oaks on the Cross-City Line.
