= Molly Badham =

Badham with Tommy the Chimp

Molly Winifred Badham MBE (18 May 1914 – 19 October 2007) was a co-founder of Twycross Zoo. She trained the chimpanzees who appeared on the Brooke Bond PG Tips television advertisements in the 1960s to the 1980s.

Badham was born in Evesham in Worcestershire, the daughter of a herbalist and homeopath. She was educated at Town School in Sutton Coldfield. She kept animals from an early age, and bred dogs and ran a boarding kennel, before setting up a pet shop in her home town. Another pet shop in the town was run by Nathalie Evans. Badham bought a woolly monkey named "Sambo" from Evans. Although the animal soon died, the two business rivals went on to share a flat – along with two chimpanzees, Sue and Mickey – and later became co-founders of Twycross Zoo.

They moved to a bungalow in Hints, between Sutton Coldfield and Tamworth, in 1954, setting up Hints Zoological Society in the 3/4 acre plot. Their collection of animals grew, and in 1962 they bought Norton Grange, a large Victorian rectory with 12 acres (49,000 m^{2}) of land, plus farm buildings and stables. They opened to visitors as Twycross Zoo on Whitsun bank holiday, 26 May 1963. Over time, the zoo expanded onto adjoining fields to cover over 40 acres (160,000 m^{2}).

Badham became an expert of primates in captivity. She provided chimpanzees for PG Tips tea commercials (notably Mr Shifter) as a way to raise funds for the zoo, and one of the zoo's chimpanzees appeared in a Hammer Horror film with Peter Cushing. She kept studbooks for gibbons and chimpanzees. The Department of the Environment appointed her as an Inspector under the Zoo Licensing Act 1981.

The zoo grew to have the largest collection of primates in the world. The first colobus monkey bred in captivity in Britain was born at the zoo in 1969, and Britain's first bonobo was born at the zoo in 1994. Badham and Evans set up a charity, the East Midlands Zoological Society, to which their animal collection and zoo premises were donated in 1972.

She published two books with Evans and Maureen Lawless: Chimps with Everything, published in 1979, and Molly's Zoo, published in 2000. She also participated in a television series, Molly's Zoo, in 1999, about the running of the zoo.

Badham was a founder member of the National Federation of Zoological Gardens of Great Britain and Ireland, and a member of the International Union of Directors of Zoological Gardens. She was awarded an honorary BSc by Leicester University in 1982, and received an MBE in the Queen's Birthday Honours 2002, for her services to the conservation of endangered species. She retired, becoming director emeritus of Twycross Zoo in 2003.

She died on 19 October 2007 at the age of 93.
