= Bourne Brook =

Stream in Staffordshire, England

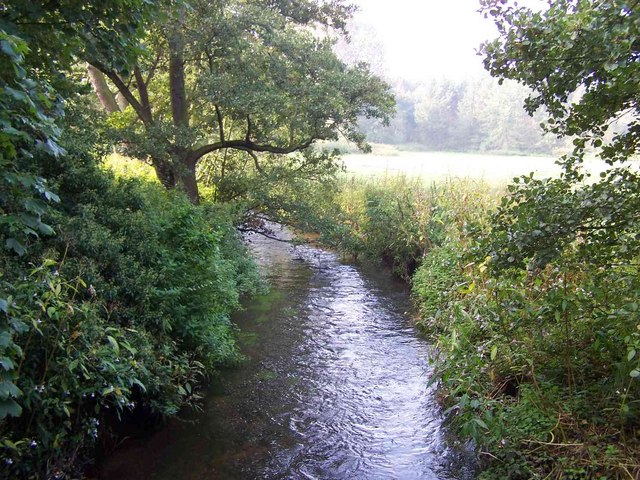
- Bourne Brook near Hints

- Confluence with the River Tame shown in Staffordshire

Location
- Country: England
- Counties: Staffordshire
- District: Lichfield District
- Town: Fazeley
- Villages: Shenstone, Weeford, Hints

Physical characteristics
- Source
  - location: Aldridge, Staffordshire
- Mouth
  - location: Fazeley, Staffordshire
  - coordinates: 52.6123°N 1.6921°W
- Length: 14 km (8.7 mi)
- Basin size: 35 km^{2} (14 sq mi)
- Progression : Bourne Brook—Tame—Trent—Humber

The Bourne Brook or Black Brook, as it is known in its upper reaches, is a tributary of the River Tame in Staffordshire, England.

== Course ==
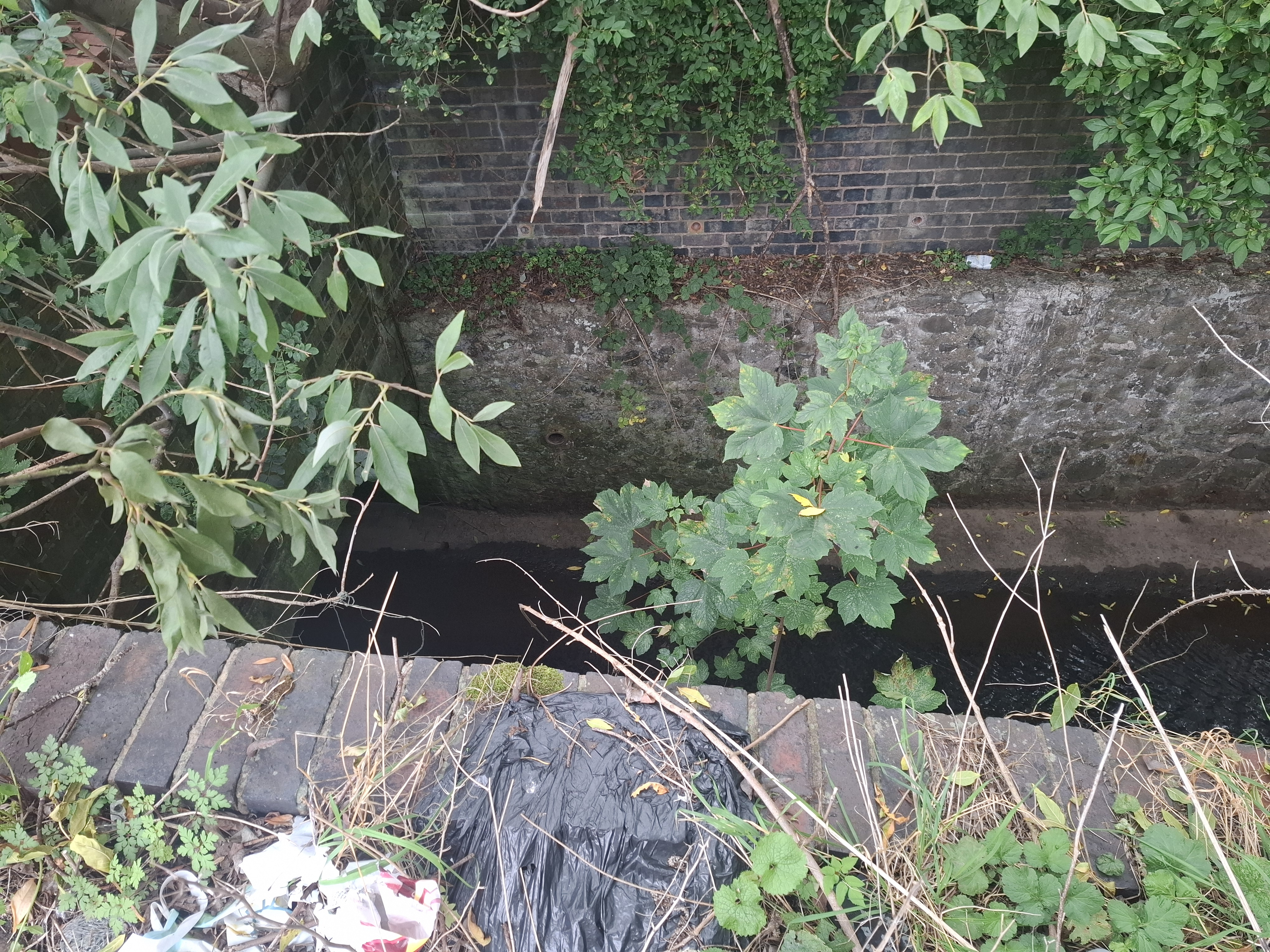
The southern source (pictured here) used to serve the moat at Weoley Castle

From its source near Aldridge where it is known as the Black Brook, it flows north, to the west and north of the village of Shenstone, then flows east past Weeford and Hints where the name changes to the Bourne Brook. It then continues through the grounds of Drayton Manor Theme Park and on to its confluence with the River Tame near Fazeley.

Its waters ultimately flow, via the River Trent and then the Humber, into the North Sea.
