= Twycross Zoo =

Zoo in England specialising in primates

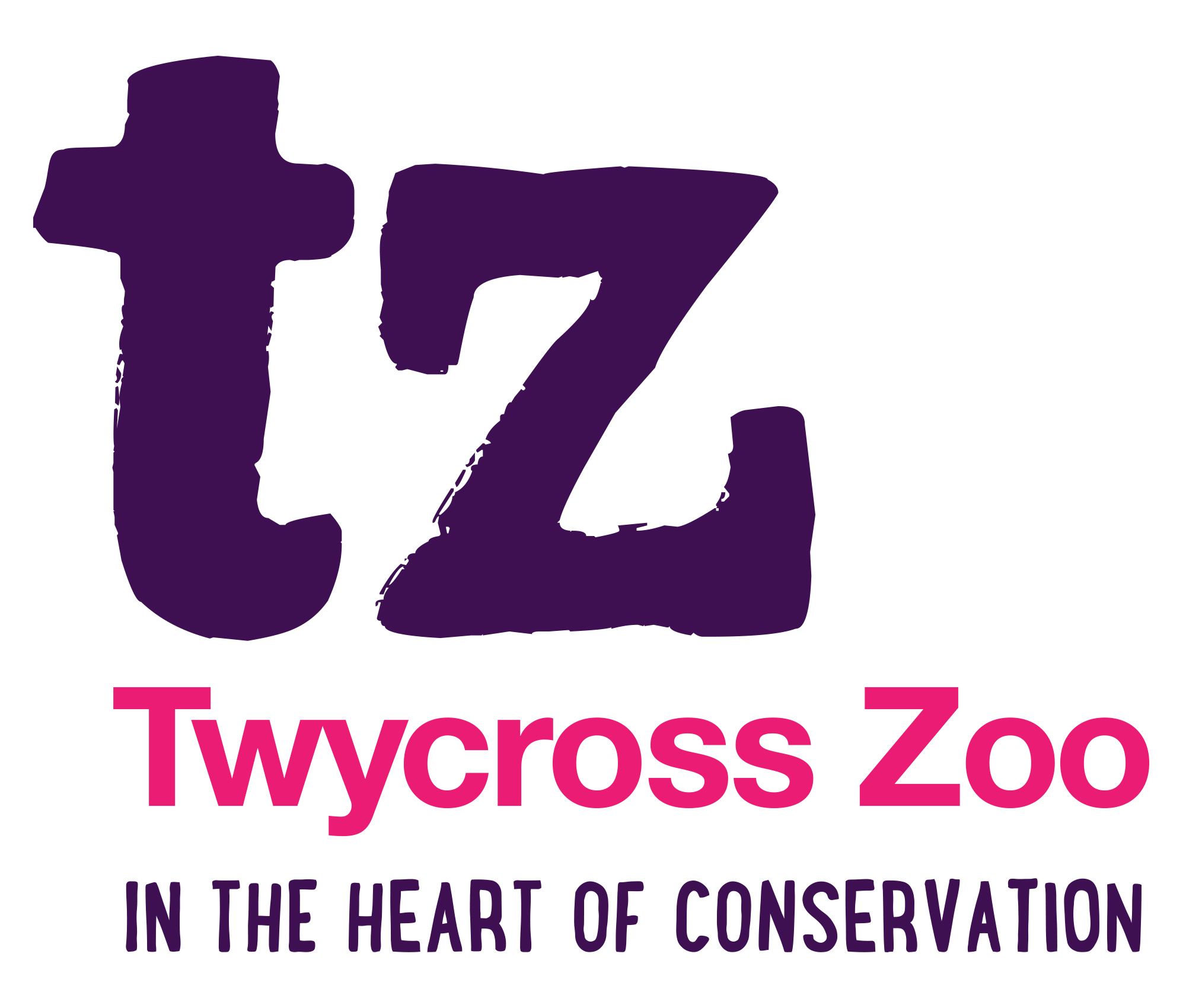
- Twycross Zoo Logo

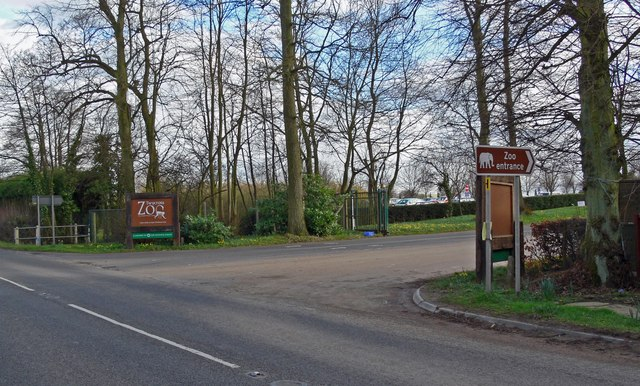
- The zoo entrance, on the A444
- Interactive map of Twycross Zoo
- Date opened: 1963
- Location: Norton Grange, Norton Juxta Twycross, Leicestershire, England
- Land area: 100 acres (40 ha)
- No. of animals: 500+
- No. of species: 125+
- Memberships: BIAZA, EAZA, WAZA
- Major exhibits: A home to 4 of the Great Apes, Chimpanzee Eden, Gibbon Forest, Primates, Birds, Mammals, Lorikeet Landing, Monkeys, Amur Leopards, Snow Leopards, Sumatran Tigers, Eastern Black Rhino, Giraffe Savannah
- Website: www.twycrosszoo.org

Twycross Zoo is a 100-acre (40 ha) zoo near Norton Juxta Twycross, Leicestershire. It is operated by the East Midlands Zoological Society, a charitable trust, and is a founding member of the British and Irish Association of Zoos and Aquariums. The zoo has one of the largest collections of primates in Europe, including four species of great ape, and is recognised as a "World Primate Centre". It has an annual attendance of around 700,000 visitors.

== History ==
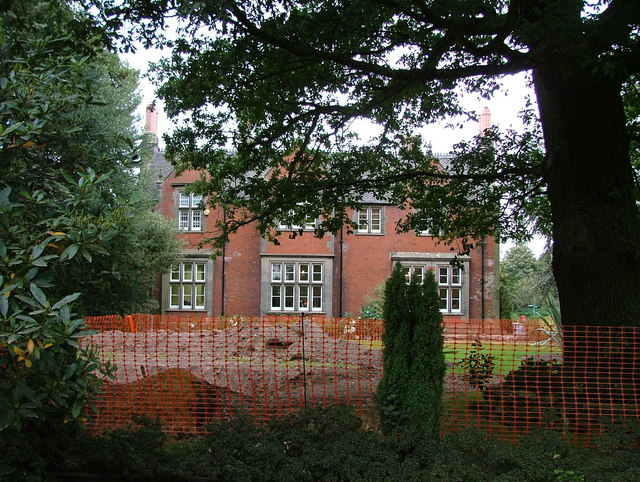
Norton Grange 2007

Twycross Zoo was established by Molly Badham and Nathalie Evans in 1963. The pair had been looking for a suitable site to expand their zoological collection, having outgrown their original site at Hints, Staffordshire where they had set up Hints Zoological Gardens in 1954. The zoo was initially based at the former rectory in the village of Norton Juxta Twycross. Having long since ceased functioning as a rectory, the house became a private residence known as Norton Grange. Badham and Evans converted the 12 acres of gardens, outbuildings, stables and farm buildings into a zoo.

The zoo first opened to the public on 26 May 1963. The opening ceremony was performed by Jean Morton, a local television personality, accompanied by her popular children's TV puppet show characters Tingha and Tucker.

In 1972 the zoo became a charitable trust and is renowned as a specialist primate centre with a wide variety of primates including all four types of great ape, boasting the UK's only group of bonobo. Twycross Zoo has become known for breeding primates and has recorded first UK births for thirteen species including the bonobo, siamang, agile gibbon and woolly monkey, contributing to numerous conservation breeding programmes.

In 2000, Badham and Evans co-wrote Molly's Zoo, a book telling the story of the zoo's history.

=== Molly Badham ===
Molly Badham was an expert in primates in captivity and highly regarded for her work with chimpanzees. Molly achieved many world firsts during her leadership, from breeding animals successfully through to being a founder member of the National Federation of Zoological Gardens of Great Britain and Ireland.

Badham provided chimpanzees for PG Tips tea commercials (notably Mr Shifter), and one of the zoo's chimpanzees appeared in a Hammer Horror film with Peter Cushing. Chimpanzees were dressed up in clothes and trained to act like humans, even ride a bike. More recent management believed that the apes should not have been used in this way.

== Animal exhibits ==
Twycross Zoo has more than 500 animals from over 125 species, including many endangered species. Renowned as a specialist primate zoo, it is the only zoo in the UK to exhibit all four types of great ape: gorilla, orangutan, chimpanzee and bonobo, the latter being the only bonobos in the country. The zoo currently houses four orangutans, four gorillas, 14 chimpanzees and 14 bonobos.

Twycross Zoo has one of the largest collections of gibbons in Europe, and 37% of their animal collection is classed as near threatened, vulnerable, endangered or critically endangered by the IUCN. Many of the animals at Twycross Zoo are part of conservation breeding programmes which help ensure a future for species threatened with extinction.

The animal exhibits at Twycross Zoo are split into eight zones:

=== Conservation Way ===
Conservation Way is home to a family of critically endangered Amur leopards, the world's rarest big cats. In June 2014, female Kristen gave birth to cubs Arina and Alexei after joining Twycross-born male Davidoff in 2013 as part of a European Association of Zoos and Aquariums breeding programme.

Endangered siamangs can also be found in Conservation Way, along with an enclosure for Chapman's zebras and the world's largest tortoise, the aldabra giant tortoise.

In 2013, the zoo's meerkat enclosure was renovated to give them almost double the space that they had previously. Their new enclosure boasts a tall artificial termite mound upon which the meerkats like to do 'sentry duty'. Ground level windows also enable young children better views of the meerkats.

The area is also home to enclosures for several species of birds. These include Vasa parrots

Next to this is Lorikeet landing, a large walkthrough enclosure where visitors are able to feed the Lorikeets

=== Wet and Wild ===
This zone is home to Humboldt penguins and Chilean flamingos. The area also used to house the Borneo longhouse aviary. The Borneo Longhouse walkthrough exhibit was opened in 2007 by actor Brian Blessed and the Malaysian High Commissioner, His Excellency Datuk Abd Aziz Mohammed. The exhibit, built to replicate a traditional longhouse, provides a naturalistic environment for the birds which live there, and enables visitors to walk inside the aviary and see first-hand the importance of wetland habitats throughout the world. There are also a number of non-avian species to be found in the Wet and Wild zone including Vicuna, Michie's Tufted deer, and the miniature monkey house, housing emperor tamarins and silvery marmosets. This zone is also home to spiny-tailed lizards, tortoises, giraffes, black rhinoceroses and Sumatran tigers.

=== Kingdom of the Apes ===
Twycross Zoo is the only zoo in the UK that is home to all four types of great ape. Kingdom of the Apes exhibits three of these, bonobos, chimpanzees and western lowland gorillas.

=== Life in the Trees ===
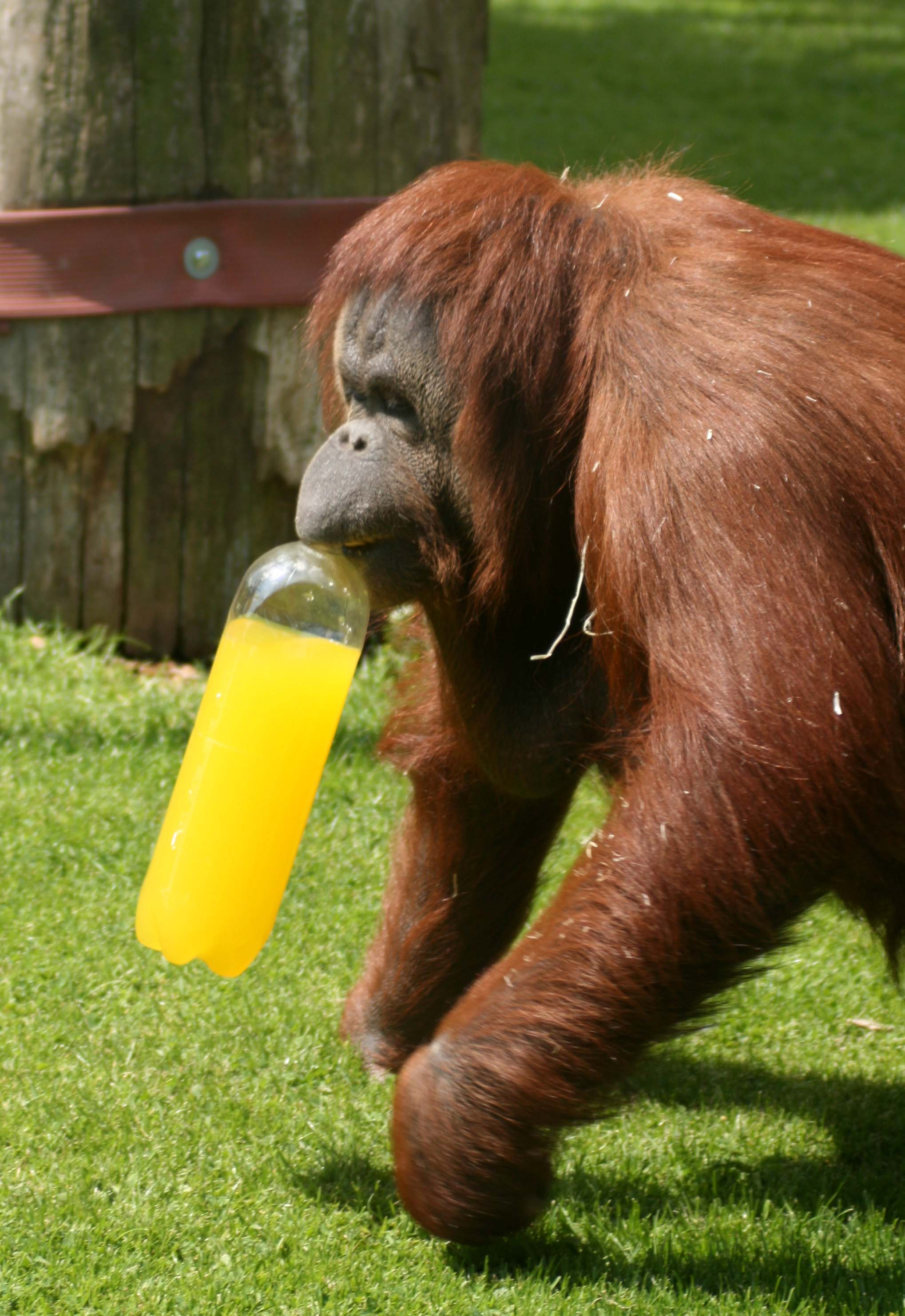
An orangutan in the zoo in 2008

Life in the Trees exhibits a number of species of both Old and New World Monkeys, including Black and Gold Howler Monkeys, red ruffed lemurs and De Brazza's monkeys to name just a few.

Twycross Zoo has one of the largest range of gibbons in Europe and these small apes can be seen in Gibbon Forest. There are currently four species of gibbon living here, including northern white-cheeked gibbons, pileated gibbons and agile gibbons. Gibbon Forest is also home to several smaller vivariums which house different reptiles, amphibians and invertebrates.

Life in the Trees houses Bornean orangutans. In 2014, a termite mound was built in the orangutan enclosure which is used as enrichment, as the holes in the mound can be filled with various items for the orangutans to extract using tools that they prepare from branches and twigs.

=== Gruffalo Discovery Land ===
In 2021, The Gruffalo Discovery Land was opened. The area tells the tale of The Gruffalo, from the children's book of the same name by Julia Donaldson, and houses some of the animals mentioned in the story, such as owls and snakes. The area is also home to Butterfly Paradise.

Butterfly Paradise is a 600 m^{2} walk-through exhibit and was designed by Twycross Zoo staff. Visitors follow a winding path through a heavily planted setting where they can see different butterflies and witness the life cycle, from chrysalis to butterfly in the dedicated hatching cabinets. Victoria crowned pigeons and other tropical birds can also be found inside.

=== Himalaya ===
The free to enter Himalaya Visitor Centre was opened in 2010 and is the entrance to the zoo. The zoo's main gift shop and 300-seat restaurant is located here. The restaurant overlooks a Himalayan mountain scene which is the enclosure for a family of endangered snow leopards.

Twycross Zoo's conference facilities are also found here, with the 100-capacity windows on the Wild Conference room. Windows on the Wild is used regularly for both corporate and social functions.

=== Nature Reserve ===
Twycross Zoo has its very own Nature Reserve, free to enter for the public. This large reserve is home for native bats, birds, insects and small mammals.

== Education ==
Twycross Zoo is home to an award-winning education department. Amongst others, the zoo holds the Learning Outside the Classroom Quality Badge, all sessions are curriculum linked and all are designed to best engage all age groups.

The zoo teaches over 15,000 school children per year in their Study Centre.

== Conservation and breeding ==
In 2006 Twycross Zoo established the Conservation Welfare Fund to make a positive contribution to animal conservation and improve animal welfare worldwide.

Since its creation it has contributed to over 55 conservation and welfare projects from 27 countries around the world. As well as financial support Twycross Zoo provides expertise in animal and veterinary care, enclosure construction and design and behavioural welfare.

Twycross Zoo currently supports the following conservation projects:

- Fauna and Flora International for their Cao Vit Gibbon Project
- Ape Action Africa to support the work of the ape sanctuary in Cameroon
- Wildlife Vets International for work with Amur leopards in the Russian Far East
- Friends of Bonobos with continued support for the world's only bonobo sanctuary: Lola ya Bonobo
- The Association Européenne pour l’Etude et la Conservation des Lémuriens (AEECL) for research, community and conservation work on Madagascar's endangered lemur habitat
- Awely for their community education team the Greencaps working in bonobo territory in the Congo

In February 2014 Twycross Zoo partnered with the United Nations Great Ape Survival Partnership to assist them in their goal to ensure the long-term survival of great apes and their habitat in Africa and Asia.

Twycross Zoo is a member of BIAZA (British and Irish Association of Zoos and Aquariums), EAZA (European Association of Zoos and Aquariums) and WAZA (World Association of Zoos and Aquariums) and members of staff chair, advise and are members of a number of specialist committees within the international zoo framework.

In June 2014, two critically endangered Amur leopard cubs were born. The father, Davidoff, was one of two Amur cubs born at the zoo in 2006.

In October 2014, a baby vicuña (a member of the camel family) was born at the zoo.

In July 2024, a pair of critically endangered red-fronted macaws were moved to the zoo with the hope that they will breed.

== Allowing re-introduction of hybrid tiger controversy ==
Tara, a hand-reared supposedly Bengal tigress acquired from Twycross Zoo in July 1976, was trained by Billy Arjan Singh and reintroduced to the wild in Dudhwa National Park, India with the permission of India's then Prime Minister Indira Gandhi, in an attempt to prove the experts wrong that zoo-bred hand-reared tigers could never be released in the wild with success. In the 1990s, some tigers from Dhudhwa were observed which had the typical appearance of Siberian tigers: white complexion, pale fur, large head and wide stripes. With recent advances in science it was subsequently found that Siberian tigers' genes had polluted the otherwise pure Bengal tiger gene pool of Dudhwa National Park. It was proved later that Twycross Zoo had been irresponsible and maintained no breeding records, and had given India a hybrid Siberian-Bengal tigress instead, although at the time, and taking into account information received regarding all of the tigers kept at Twycross Zoo, it was believed that Tara was a pure Bengal tiger at that time. Dudhwa tigers constitute about 1% of India's total wild population, but the possibility exists of this genetic pollution spreading to other tiger groups; at its worst, this could jeopardize the Bengal tiger as a distinct subspecies.

With the advent of co-ordinated breeding programmes for numerous species help in captivity and standardised electronic animal record keeping systems (ARKS), it is now possible to track the different subspecies that are managed and ensure that these are managed as pure subspecies. Twycross Zoo is now recognised as having a database of the animals in its care, both current and historically, that is comparable to any major zoological garden worldwide.
