= John Floyer (Tamworth MP) =

- Born: c. 1681
- Died: 4 June 1762
- Occupation: Politician
- Parent(s): Sir John Floyer; Mary Fleetwood
- Relatives: Henry Fleetwood (maternal stepbrother)

John Floyer (c. 1681 – 4 June 1762) was an English politician from Staffordshire.

== Early life ==
John Floyer was born circa 1681. He was the oldest son of the physician Sir John Floyer of Hints Hall, near Lichfield in Staffordshire. His mother Mary was the daughter and co-heir of Sir Henry Archbold of Abbots Bromley, Staffordshire, the chancellor of the diocese of Lichfield. She was the widow of Arthur Fleetwood of Lichfield and mother of Henry Fleetwood, the Member of Parliament (MP) for Preston.

== Career ==
At the 1741 general election, he was elected as a Tory MP for Tamworth. However, his election was overturned on petition on 22 March 1742, and he never stood for Parliament again.

In 1743 his name was included in a list of leading Jacobite sympathizers prepared for the French foreign office.

Parliament of Great Britain
| Preceded by Lord John Philip Sackville; Charles Cotes | Member of Parliament for Tamworth; 1741 – 1742; With: Lord John Philip Sackville | Succeeded by Lord John Philip Sackville; Charles Cotes |
