= EcoDisc =

DVD-based format

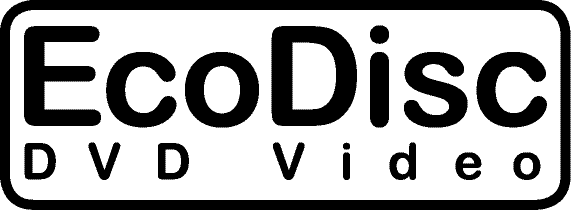
- Media type: optical disc
- Developed by: EcoDisc

An EcoDisc is a patented type of DVD which is thinner than a conventional DVD because it is made from a single layer of polycarbonate instead of two layers glued together. Because it contains less material, its manufacture produces only around half of the carbon dioxide of a conventional DVD, and the absence of a non-biodegradable toxic glue layer makes it easier to recycle. Ecodiscs are prone to breakage (accidental or otherwise) since they are much less stiff than regular discs.

EcoDisc Technology AG licenses manufacturers of the discs, and also holds the rights to the EcoDisc logo.

The discs are used for covermounts by magazine publishers because their flexibility makes them less prone to damage during handling and transportation than rigid conventional DVDs, and shipping costs are reduced because of their lower weight.

The maximum capacity of the discs is 4.7 GB; as of 2011, double-layer 8.5 GB capacity was not available.

Although earlier versions of the EcoDisc occasionally showed problems with slot-loading drives (especially with those of Apple's MacBook), these problems have since been remedied.

In 2009 and 2010, Testronic Laboratories, a quality assurance and testing company, performed tests to assess compatibility on around 600 different models of player and drive, representing 80-90% of the installed product base, and found the disc compatible with all but one of the drives (the failing drive was a 1998 Sony DVP-S315).
