= PG Tips =

British tea maker now owned by Lipton

- Product type: Tea
- Current owner: Lipton Teas and Infusions
- Country: United Kingdom
- Introduced: 1930; 96 years ago

PG Tips is a brand of tea in the United Kingdom manufactured by Lipton Teas and Infusions.

== Brand name ==
In the 1930s, Brooke Bond launched PG Tips in the tea market in the United Kingdom under the name Pre-Gestee, a variant of the original name "Digestive Tea". The name implied that it could be drunk as a digestive aid prior to eating food. Grocers and salesmen abbreviated it to "PG".

Following the Second World War, labelling regulations ruled out describing tea as aiding digestion—a property that had been attributed to tea—and by 1950–1951 the PG name was adopted. The company added Tips referring to the fact that only the tips (the top two leaves and bud) of the tea plants are used in the blend.

== Products ==
The Brooke Bond name has now been dropped from all packaging and the product is now known as PG Tips. It is available as loose tea, tea bags, and in vending formats. A "Special Blend" tea, which is the same as the tea blended for the brand's 75th anniversary, is available in tea bag form only. The tea used in PG Tips is imported in bulk as estate teas from around the world and blended in precise proportions set by the tea tasters to make blend 777, which can contain between 12 and 35 estate teas (depending on the season, etc.) at the Trafford Park factory in the Metropolitan Borough of Trafford, Greater Manchester.

PG Tags, tea bags with a string, were launched in 1985. Tetrahedron-shaped tea bags, branded as "Pyramid Bags," launched in 1996. The tetrahedral bag was designed to help the tea leaves move more freely, as loose tea moves in a teapot, and supposedly create a better infusion. One 2011 version of the product packaging made the claim: "The PG Tips pyramid tea bag gives the tea leaves 50% more room to move around than a flat conventional tea bag. So the tea bag works more like a miniature teapot. This allows for all the freshness to be released for the best-tasting cup of PG." During the T-Birds era, the tetrahedral tea bags were remade with a "freeflow" material to allow further infusion of the tea.

In Scotland, Lipton Teas and Infusions sells a specially developed blend of PG called Scottish Blend. It is marketed as being specially blended to optimise taste in the soft waters of Scotland.

In Ireland, Lipton Teas and Infusions sells tea under the Lyons brand.

As of 2011, a "Special Moments" range was released, initially as the "New Ones." These teas were made by pressing the leaves at different stages. In 2014, Unilever introduced a new range of fruit, herbal, and green teas under the PG Tips brand.

In 2023, PG Tips announced the creation of a quick-brew teabag that could brew a cup of tea in 60 seconds. This resulted in the teabags being "the market's only square tea bags," at the cost of discontinuing the pyramid bags.

In 2026, PG Tips changed the blend in their bags, promising an “improved taste and fuller flavour”. The bag weight increased, and 7.7% more tea was added. The packaging was also changed, switching to a heritage inspired package. Though the weight increased, the price was still frozen at the rates they were before. Additionally, the brand’s main quote “Live Life One Tea At a Time” is still present on the updated

== Advertising ==
Unlike the blended teas many companies were producing, Brooke's teas were pure, high quality teas from India and China. Brooke realised the importance of advertising early on, introducing the slogan, "Good tea unites good company, exhilarates the spirits, banishes restraint from conversation and promotes the happiest purposes of social intercourse."

=== The Tipps family (1956–2002) ===
In 1956, PG Tips began using anthropomorphic chimpanzees in their television advertisements. These were dressed in human clothes in the fashion of chimpanzees' tea party and were known as the "Tipps family." Their voices were often provided by celebrities, such as Peter Sellers, Donald Sinden and Bob Monkhouse. By 1958, PG Tips had risen from fourth to first place in the British tea market. The chimpanzees were from Twycross Zoo in Leicestershire.

These advertisements were stopped in the 1970s after complaints made by animal rights organisations. However, the chimpanzees were brought back 18 months later when sales began to drop. The last 'Tipps family' advert was broadcast in January 2002. The PG Tips chimpanzees spawned a spinoff in memorabilia which include trading cards and figurines. Prior to the chimpanzee-inspired cards, PG Tips had included trading cards modelled on cigarette cards, but targeted at children. Production of these ceased in 1999 for unknown reasons.

The notable 1988 advert with the Mr Shifter piano removal was voiced by Michael Robbins and Irene Handl.

In January 2014, Twycross Zoo reported that 42-year-old Choppers was the last surviving PG Tips chimp, after her cohabitant Louis had died in his enclosure in July the previous year. Louis had played the bowler hat-wearing Mr Shifter in the advert with the punchline: "Dad, do you know the piano's on my foot?" "You hum it, son, I'll play it!"

=== The T-Birds (2002–2005) ===
The "Tipps family" were replaced in January 2002, with a house-sharing group of claymation birds called the T-Birds (which consisted of Tom the owl, Maggie the pigeon, Pete the starling, and Holly the blue tit), animated by Aardman, who are the company behind Wallace and Gromit and Chicken Run. In Ireland, these commercials were still airing by the end of 2006, though advertising Lyons Tea (another Unilever brand), even though Holly was renamed as Niamh to fit in with Irish audiences.

This led to PG Tips becoming a major partner with Wallace and Gromit's first film The Curse of the Were-Rabbit, launched in October 2005. PG offered Gromit mugs on pack in the supermarket. According to The Grocer magazine, Unilever reported that during the Gromit mug promotion, PG Tips sales increased 600%. Wallace and Gromit also appeared in an advert with Lady Tottington (another character from the film) around the same time.

In 2005, PG Tips celebrated its 75th anniversary with special packs, including a limited-edition Golden pack, and a one-off Diamond tea bag. The Diamond tea bag cost £7,500, and was made by Boodles jewelers and used Makaibari Silver Tips (Imperial).

The T-Birds would sponsor Creature Comforts, a television show which would air on ITV.

=== Monkey (2007–2024, 2025–) ===
In January 2007, PG Tips reunited Johnny Vegas as Al and the ITV Digital Monkey character made by Paul Jomain, puppeteered by Nigel Plaskitt and Susan Beattie, and voiced by Ben Miller. ITV Digital had used the Monkey character in its own advertising but had entered administration in March 2002. In the end, ITV Digital's former terrestrial multiplexes were taken over by Crown Castle and the BBC to create the Freeview free-to-air service. The first commercial was titled "The Return", and saw Monkey returning to Al's house on a dark and stormy night, seeking to reignite their friendship after five years on the run. The Monkey character pointedly explains in said commercial that he is not a chimpanzee, he is a monkey, a nod to PG Tips' chimpanzee family.

One of the adverts was a spoof of the "deli scene" from the movie When Harry Met Sally.... In the advert, Monkey describes the taste of PG Tips by saying "Oh Yes" repeatedly similarly like in the movie. The advert then moves to a scene with a woman at a nearby table asking the waiter "I'll have whatever he's having". The advert ends with the tagline "How would you describe the taste?" It was first shown on 3 February 2010.

Another advert, promoting the naturally occurring theanine in PG Tips, featured Monkey and Al playing the characters of Captain Mainwaring and Private Pike from the popular sitcom Dad's Army.

When PG Tips released the "Special Moments" range (initially "The New Ones"), another advert was released to advertise the "Fresh" one. It featured Monkey and Al out rambling. Monkey says to Al that they need a cup of the "Fresh" one. Al takes so long to decide how the tea tastes that before he can come to a conclusion, Monkey has been swept away by an eagle. This advert was later modified showing Monkey being dropped off in the eagle's nest with the four flavours of the Special Moments range, as well as two eagle chicks next to him.

After the US federal decision in support of same-sex marriage in 2015, PG Tips depicted its Monkey character under the rainbow flag in a message of support for gay marriage, which received some criticism for being a political statement.

In 2015, as part of a rebrand, adverts featured Monkey observing absurd things and deciding to "Keep it tea."

In 2017, PG tips, Unilever, and software company Ubisend worked together to bring the Monkey persona to life through a Facebook Messenger chatbot for the Red Nose Day charity. For over three weeks leading up to Red Nose Day, Facebook Messenger users could message Monkey and interact with him through his chatbot. Monkey also delivered one daily joke to each of his chatbot users at tea time with the goal of raising One Million Laughs for Comic Relief.

In May 2024, PG Tips officially retired the Monkey character, stating that he was having a "well-deserved retirement".

In May 2025, Monkey (now voiced by Ivo Graham) returned to the adverts. In the adverts, he was married to a woman named Alice (portrayed by Emily Atack).

=== A Tale of Two Continents ===
A Tale of Two Continents
- Directed by: Darren Bailes
- Release date: 21 March 2008 (cinema)
- Running time: 9 minutes (extended DVD run) 5 (cinema run)
- Country: United Kingdom
- Language: English

A short film entitled A Tale of Two Continents was released in March 2008. It is an adventure film parody, starring Monkey "wanting to change the world one tea at a time". It was shown in cinemas from 21 March 2008 until 10 April, before the showings of family films such as The Spiderwick Chronicles and Horton Hears a Who!

It was also given free in special limited edition versions of PG Tips in early 2008 as an EcoDisc, a type of DVD that is thinner and more flexible due to it being made of a single layer of polycarbonate, instead of two layers. The limited edition package also featured a teatowel of the EcoDisc cover described as the "official merchandise" of the film.

== PG Tips and public campaigns ==
In May 2007, Unilever became the first company to commit to sourcing all its tea in a sustainable manner. To that end, the company asked the Rainforest Alliance, an international environmental NGO to start certifying tea estates in East Africa. Since April 2012, all of the tea used in PG Tips has been Rainforest Alliance certified.

In February 2011, PG Tips stated it would stop testing its teas on animals.

In February 2023, the BBC reported that an investigation had found more than 70 women had been sexually abused on tea farms in Kenya that supply PG Tips.

== Slogans ==
- "Live life one tea at a time" (Monkey)
- "Keep it tea" (Monkey)
- "You, me and a cup of PG" (Al and Monkey)
- "How would you describe the taste?" (Al and Monkey)
- "Do your bit, put the kettle on" (Al and Monkey)
- "We All Need a PG Moment" (used during the T-Birds era)
- "There's no other tea to beat PG" (later chimpanzee ads), followed by "It's the taste!" spoken by a chimpanzee
- "Dad, do you know the piano's on my foot?" Mr Shifter: You hum it son, I'll play it!
- "Avez-vous un cuppa?" (Tour De France)
- "It's the Tea you can really Taste" (Earlier chimpanzee ads)
- ”the nation’s favourite” (Monkey)

== See also ==
- Lipton
