= Canwell Priory =

Monastery in Staffordshire, England

Canwell Priory was a medieval monastic house in Staffordshire, England, founded ca. 1140.
