= John Floyer (physician) =

English physician and author (1649–1734)

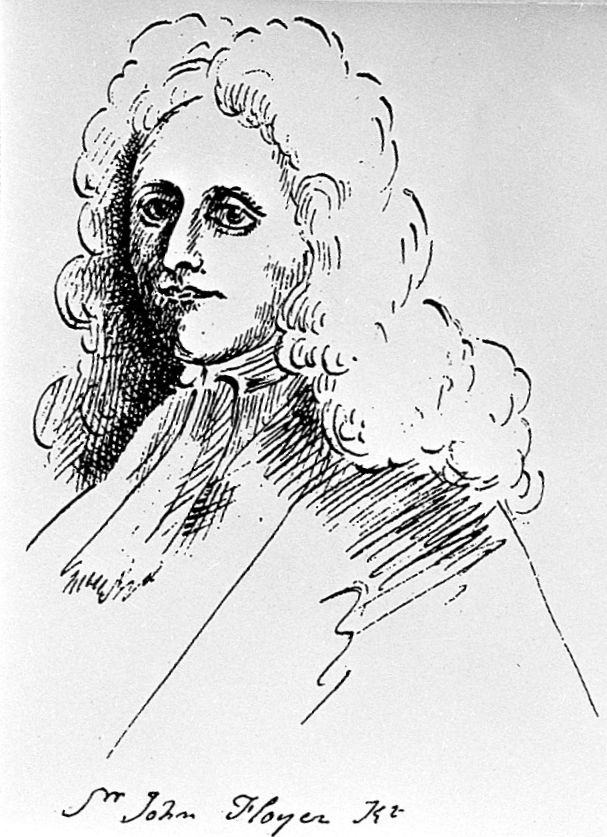
- John Floyer, 1707–10. Credit: Wellcome Library
- Born: 3 March 1649; Hints, Staffordshire, England
- Died: 1 February 1734 (aged 84)
- Education: University of Oxford
- Occupations: Physician, author
- Spouse: Mary Fleetwood
- Children: John Floyer
- Parent(s): Richard Floyer; Elizabeth Babington

Sir John Floyer (3 March 1649 – 1 February 1734) was an English physician and writer.

== Early life ==
John Floyer was born on 3 March 1649. He was the third child and second son of Elizabeth Babington and Richard Floyer, of Hints Hall, a since demolished country house. Hints is a quiet village lying a short distance from Lichfield in Staffordshire. He was educated at The Queen's College, University of Oxford.

== Career ==
He practised in Lichfield, and it was by his advice that Dr Johnson, when a child, was taken by his mother to be touched by Queen Anne for the king's evil on 30 March 1714. As a physician, Floyer was best known for introducing the practice of pulse rate measurement, and creating a special watch for this purpose. He was an advocate of cold bathing, and gave an early account of the pathological changes in the lungs associated with emphysema.

== Personal life ==
Floyer was married to Mary Fleetwood of Lichfield, a widow, in April 1680. Their son John Floyer (c.1681–1762) was a Tory Member of Parliament for Tamworth from 1741 to 1742.

He died on 1 February 1734.

== Bibliography ==
- Pharmako-Basanos: or the Touchstone of Medicines, discovering the virtues of Vegetables, Minerals and Animals, by their Tastes and Smells (2 vols, 1687)
- The praeternatural State of animal Humours described by their sensible Qualities (1696)
- An Enquiry into the right Use and Abuses of the hot, cold and temperate Baths in England (1697)
- A Treatise of the Asthma (1st edition, 1698)
- The ancient psychrolousia revived, or an Essay to prove cold bathing both safe and useful (London, 1702; several editions 8vo; abridged, Manchester, 1844, 12mo) See online version below.
  - John Floyer & Edward Baynard (1715). Psychrolousia. Or, the History of Cold Bathing: Both Ancient and Modern. In Two Parts. The First, written by Sir John Floyer, of Litchfield. The Second, treating the genuine life of Hot and Cold Baths..(exceedingly long subtitles) By Dr. Edward Baynard. London: William Innys. Fourth Edition, with Appendix. Full text at Internet Archive (archive.org)
- The Physician's Pulse-watch (1707–1710)
- The Sibylline Oracles, translated from the best Greek copies, and compared with the sacred Prophecies. London: J.Nicholson. 1713. Full text at Internet Archive (archive.org)
  - See also: Sibylline oracles article.
- Two Essays:... London. 1717. Full text at Internet Archive (archive.org)
  - the first Essay concerning the Creation, Aetherial Bodies, and Offices of good and bad Angels
  - the second Essay concerning the Mosaic System of the World (Nottingham, 1717)
- An Exposition of the Revelations (1719)
- An Essay to restore the Dipping of Infants in their Baptism (1722)
- Medicina Gerocomica, or the Galenic Art of preserving old Men's Healths (1st edition, 1724)
- A Comment on forty-two Histories described by Hippocrates (1726).
