= List of German inventors and discoverers =

This is a list of German inventors and discoverers. The following list comprises people from Germany or German-speaking Europe, and also people of predominantly German heritage, in alphabetical order of the surname.

For the list containing items and ideas invented and/or discovered by Germans, see list of German inventions and discoveries.

Existing:	A	B	C	D	E	F	G	H	I	J	K	L	M	N	O	P	Q	R	S	T	U	V	W	X	Y	Z
See also						Notes						References						External links

== A ==
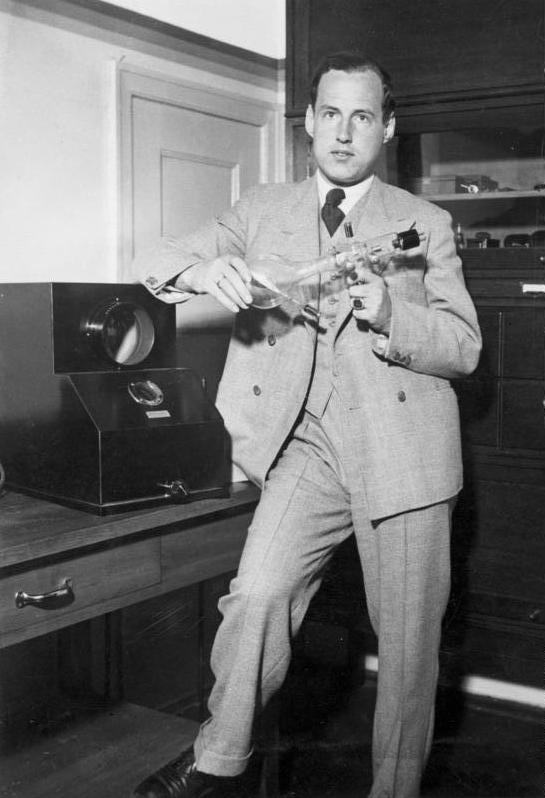
Manfred von Ardenne in 1933

- Ernst Abbe: Invented the first refractometer, and many other devices. Donated his shares in the company Carl Zeiss to form Carl-Zeiss-Stiftung, still in existence today.
- Franz Carl Achard: Developed a process to produce sugar from sugar beet. Built the first factory for the process in 1802.
- Robert Adler: Invented a better television remote control.
- Konrad Adenauer: Invented soya sausage (1916; "Kölner Wurst") and, together with Jean and Josef Oebel, [coarse] wholemeal bread (1917; Kölner Brot).
- Georgius Agricola: Named "the father of mineralogy".
- Wilhelm Albert: Invented the wire rope 1834.
- Kurt Alder: Discovery of the Diels–Alder reaction, Nobel Prize in Chemistry 1950.
- Richard Altmann: Discovery of the Mitochondrion
- Alois Alzheimer: Psychiatrist who discovered Alzheimer's disease, a degeneration of the brain in old age.
- Momme Andresen (1857–1951): industrial research chemist who made inventions relating to photography
- Ottomar Anschütz: in 1883 he patented a camera with an internal roller blind shutter mechanism, just in front of the photographic plate. Thus the focal-plane shutter in modern recognizable form was born.
- Hermann Anschütz-Kaempfe: Invented the gyrocompass in 1907.
- Manfred von Ardenne: Self-taught researcher, applied physicist, and inventor. 600 patents in fields including television and radio, electron microscopy, medical technology, nuclear technology, and plasma physics.
- Friedrich Wilhelm August Argelander: cataloged all stars brighter than approximately magnitude 9.5 and north of -2 degrees in the Bonner Durchmusterung, the first large-scale modern star catalog.
- Leo Arons: Mercury-vapor lamp together with Peter Cooper Hewitt.
- Leopold Auerbach: Discovery of Plexus myentericus Auerbachi, or Auerbach's plexus.
- Max Abraham: Physicist. Worked as Max Planck's assistant for three years. Developed theories on electrons.

== B ==
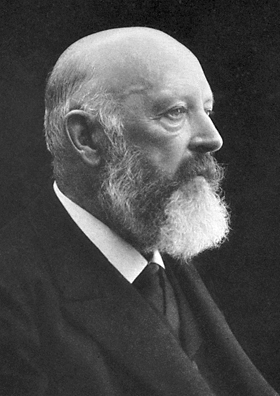
Adolf von Baeyer

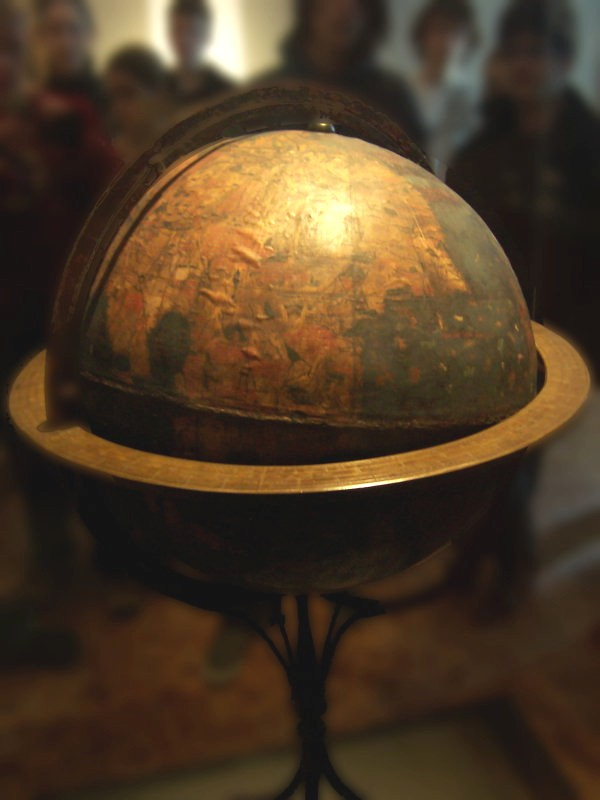
Martin Behaim's Globe 1493

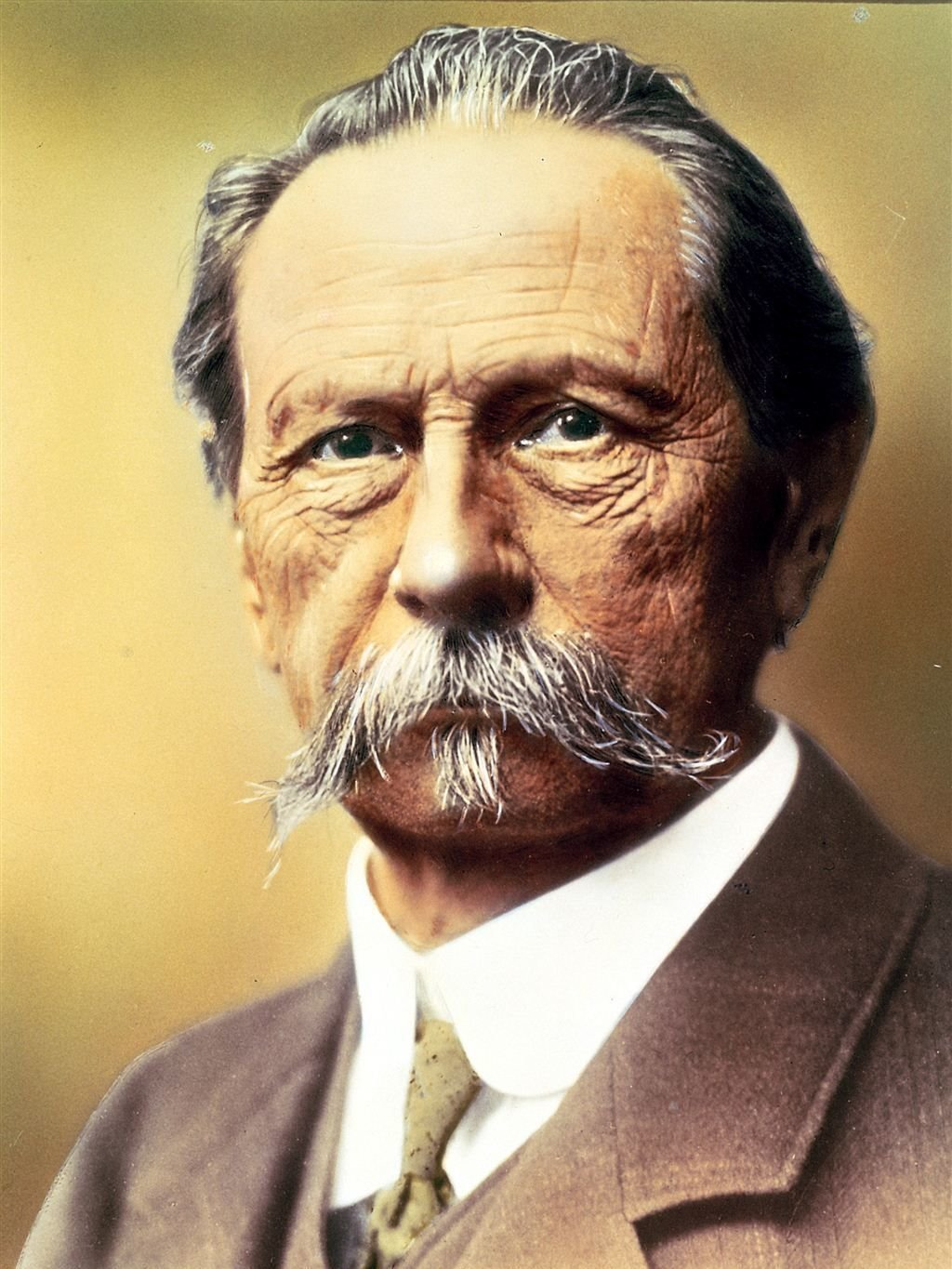
Carl Benz

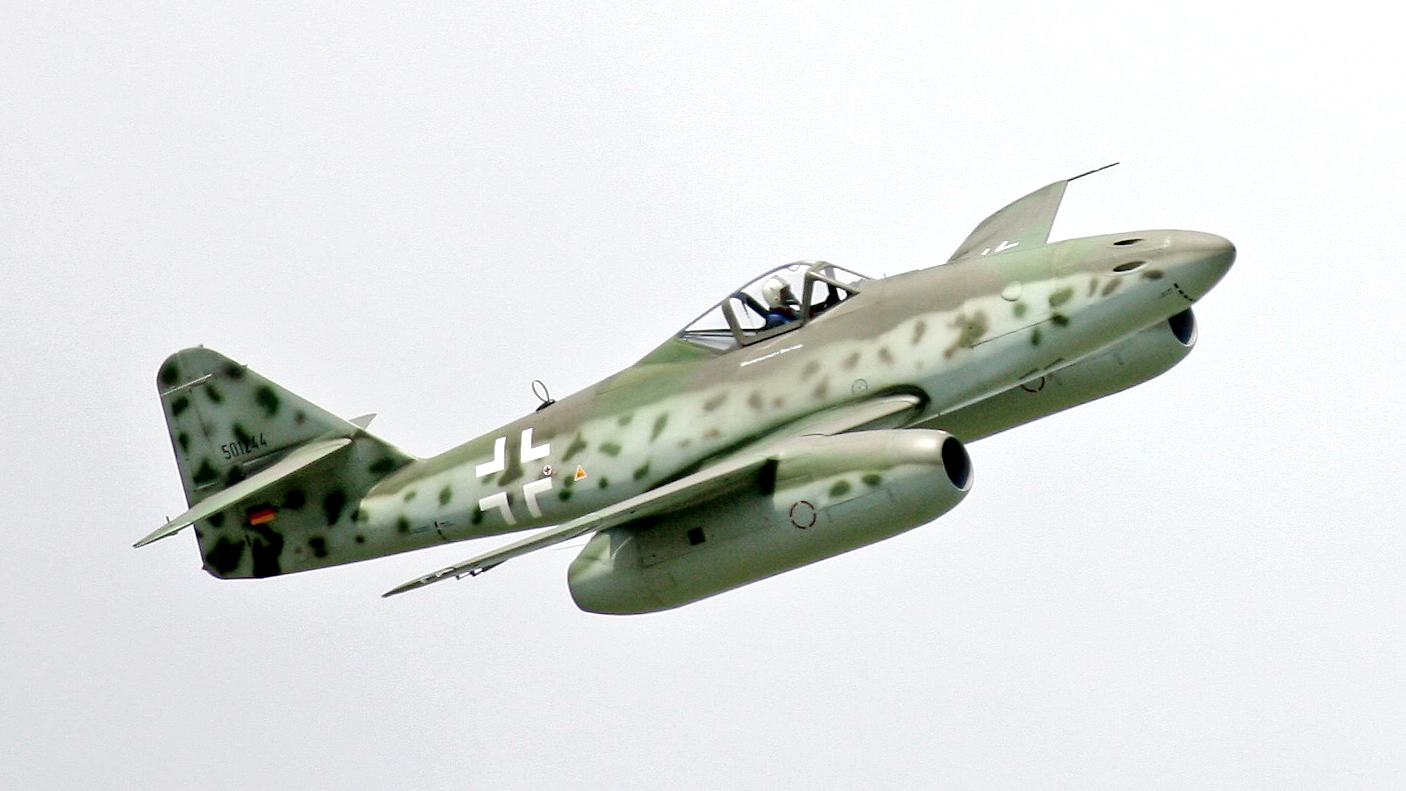
Ludwig Bölkow, instrumental in the development of the Me 262

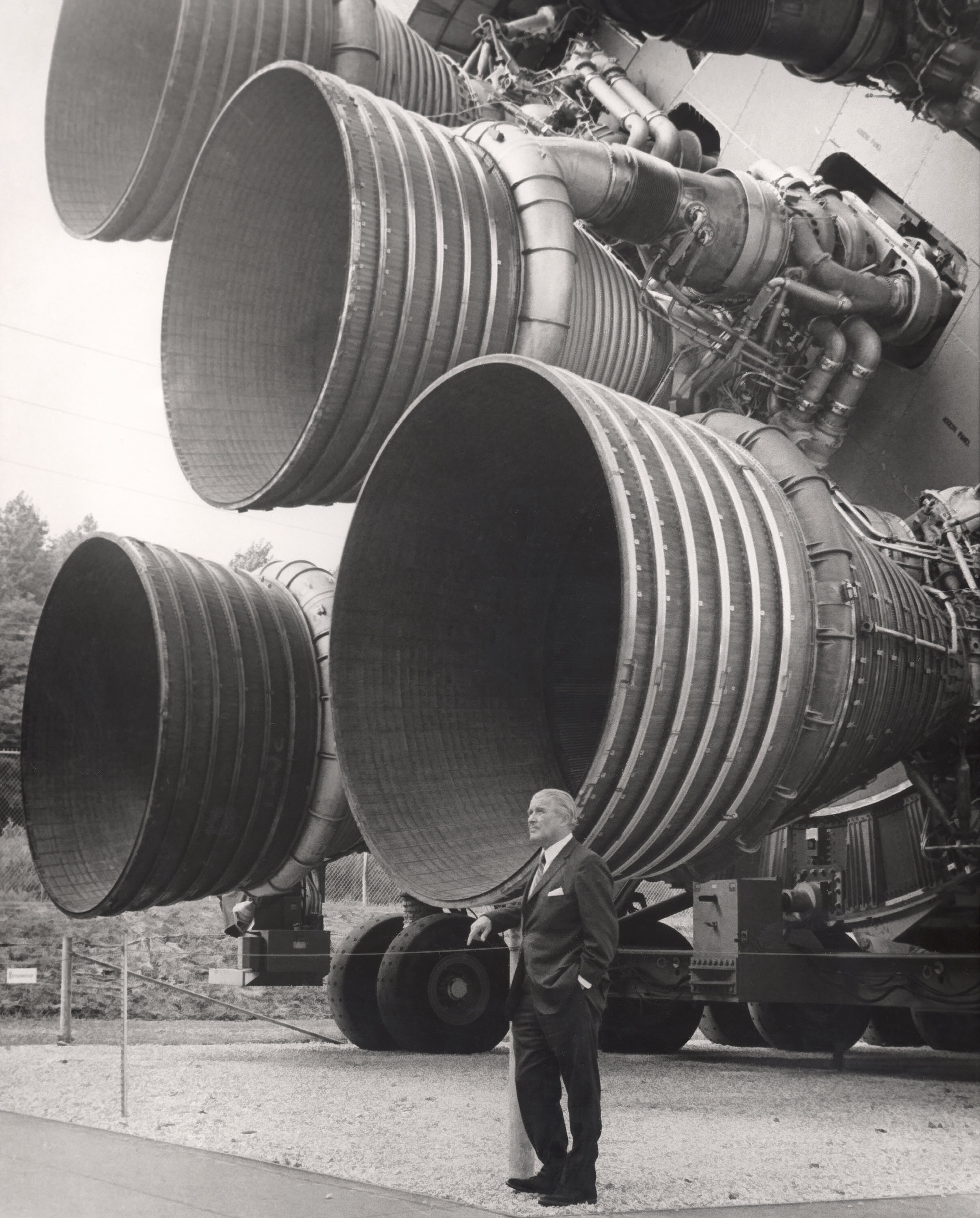
Wernher von Braun

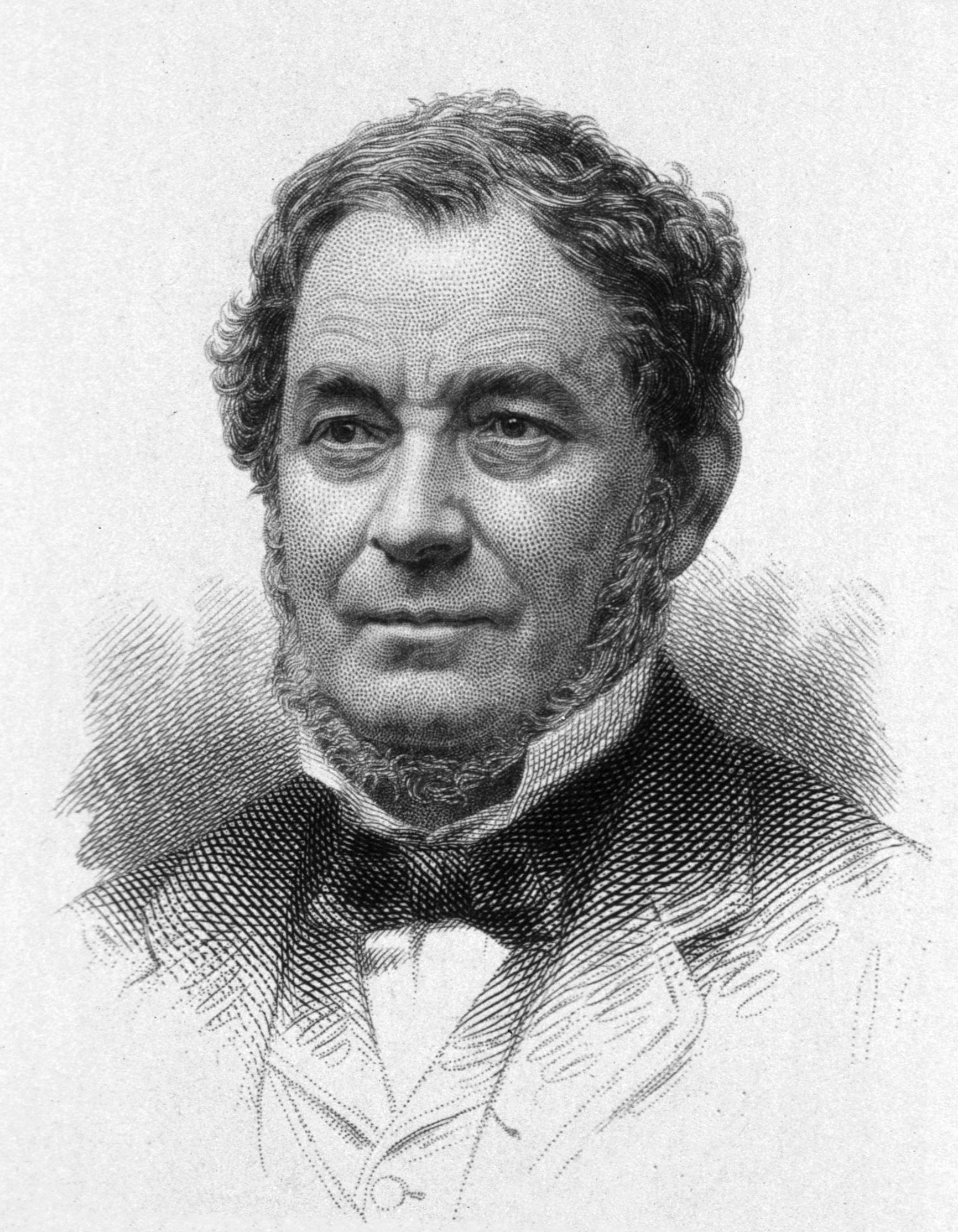
Robert Bunsen

- Walter Baade: astronomer. With Fritz Zwicky, he identified supernovae as a new category of astronomical objects
- Karl Ernst von Baer: discovered mammal ovum.
- Ralph Baer: Inventor of the first home video game console.
- Adolf von Baeyer: Chemist. Synthesized indigo, discovered the phthalein dyes, and investigated polyacetylenes, oxonium salts, nitroso compounds (1869) and uric acid derivatives (1860 and onwards) including the discovery of barbituric acid (1864). Nobel laureate 1905.
- Otto Bayer: Chemist. Invented polyurethane.
- Albert Ballin: Father of modern cruise ship travel
- Heinrich Band: Developed a musical instrument and called it bandoneón in 1846. It is still used in most tango orchestras.
- Heinrich Barkhausen: Discovered what is now called the Barkhausen effect, to describe the phenomenon, which is caused by rapid changes of size of magnetic domains in 1919, and Barkhausen stability criterion.
- Oskar Barnack: The father of the first mass marketed 35mm camera and Leica.
- Heinrich Anton de Bary: Father of Phytopathology, the science of plant diseases and modern Mycology. Coined the word symbiosis in 1879.
- Karl Adolph von Basedow: Discovery and description of Graves-Basedow disease
- Andreas Friedrich Bauer: first functional steam-powered printing press with his colleague Friedrich Koenig
- Wilhelm Bauer: Inventor and engineer, who built several hand-powered submarines.
- Eugen Baumann: He was one of the first people to create polyvinyl chloride (PVC), and, together with Carl Schotten, he discovered the Schotten-Baumann reaction.
- Hans Beck: Inventor of the toy Playmobil.
- Georg Bednorz: Physicist, discovered high-temperature superconductivity in ceramics, shared the 1987 Nobel Prize in Physics.
- Martin Behaim: Inventor of the first globe of the world (Erdapfel) between 1491 and 1493.
- Alexander Behm: Inventor of echo sounding. The patent was granted in 1913.
- Emil Adolf von Behring: physiologist. Discovered the diphtheria antitoxin. It was the world's first cure for a disease (1891). He was awarded history's first Nobel Prize in Physiology of Medicine in 1901.
- Fabian Gottlieb von Bellingshausen: Navigator and explorer. Discovered the land mass of Antarctica on January 28, 1820.
- Melitta Bentz: entrepreneur. She is an inventor of the coffee filter, 1908.
- Bertha Benz: invented brake lining.
- Karl Benz: industrialist. Father and inventor of the gasoline-powered automobile, 1885 (Benz Patent-Motorwagen), and pioneering founder of automobile manufacturing.
- Albrecht Berblinger: engineer. Inventor of the spring prosthesis and hang-glider (1811). (Note: Albrecht Ludwig Berblinger (1770-1829), known as the "Flying Tailor of Ulm", started with flight experiments in Ulm, Germany, in the early 19th century. He gained experience in downhill gliding with a maneuverable airworthy semi-rigid hang-glider and then attempted to cross the Danube River at Ulm's Eagle's Bastion on 31 May 1811. The tricky local winds caused him to crash and he was rescued by fishermen, making him the first survivor of a water immersion accident of a heavier-than-air manned "flight machine". Though he failed in his attempt to be the first man to fly, Berblinger can be regarded as one of the significant aviation pioneers who applied the "heavier than air" principle and paved the way for the more effective glide-flights of Otto Lilienthal (1891) and the Wright Brothers (1902). Less known are Berblinger's significant contributions to the construction of artificial limbs for medical use, as well as the spring-application in aviation. His invention of a special mechanical joint was also used for the juncture of the wings of his "flying machine". Because of his worthwhile contributions to medicine and flight, in 1993 the German Academy of Aviation Medicine named an annual award for young scientists in the field of aerospace medicine in his honor.)
- Hans Berger: a German neurologist, best known as the inventor of electroencephalography (EEG) (the recording of "brain waves") in 1924, coining the name, and the discoverer of the alpha wave rhythm known as "Berger's wave"
- Emil Berliner: He is best known for developing the microphone and disc recording gramophone.
- Friedrich Bessel: astronomer; he is credited with being the first to use parallax in calculating the distance to a star.
- Hans Bethe: Nuclear physicist and Nobel laureate in physics 1967. During World War II, he was head of the Theoretical Division at the secret Los Alamos laboratory which developed the first atomic bombs.
- Albert Betz: physicist. Betz's law, 1913
- Heinz Billing: Computer scientist. He invented the magnetic drum memory and built prototype laser interferometric gravitational wave detector in Garching, Munich.
- Gerd Binnig: Physicist. Design of the scanning tunneling microscope (STM) with Heinrich Rohrer. Nobel laureate 1986.
- Otto von Bismarck: Under his reign, the German Empire (1871–1918) became the first modern welfare state in the world, when he e.g. innovatively implemented the following: health insurance (1883), accident insurance (1884), pension insurance (1889).
- Ludwig Blattner: developed the Blattnerphone, the first magnetic tape recorder (using steel tape) whilst working in Britain in the late 1920s.
- Günter Blobel: biologist, discovered signal peptides. Nobel Prize in Physiology or Medicine in 1999.
- Walter Bock: chemist, Styrene-butadiene
- Max Bockmühl: chemist, he developed Methadone together with German Gustav Ehrhart in 1937 in Germany, working for I.G. Farbenindustrie AG at the Farbwerke Hoechst
- Johann Elert Bode: astronomer, Discovered the Titus-Bode Law
- Ludwig Bölkow: Aeronautical pioneer. Was instrumental in the development of the Me 262, developed a new rotorhead concept for helicopters.
- Max Born: Physicist and mathematician. Groundbreaking work in quantum mechanics. Nobel laureate 1954 with Walther Bothe. His Ph.D. student Delbrück, and six of his assistants (Fermi, Heisenberg, Goeppert-Mayer, Herzberg, Pauli, Wigner) went on to win Nobel Prizes. His Ph.D. student J. Robert Oppenheimer led the project to develop the atomic bomb.
- Manfred Börner: Physicist. Developed the first working fiber-optical data transmission system in 1965. Received a patent for an "electro-optical transmission system utilizing lasers".
- Carl Bosch: Chemist and Nobel laureate, discovered the processes of industrial high-pressure chemistry.
- Robert Bosch: industrialist, engineer. He invented, engineered and launched various innovations for the motor vehicle.
- Walther Bothe: Nuclear physicist, who shared the Nobel Prize in Physics in 1954 with Max Born.
- Johann Friedrich Böttger: alchemist. He was generally acknowledged as the inventor of European porcelain although more recent sources ascribe this to Ehrenfried Walther von Tschirnhaus. Böttger is still credited with developing the manufacture of porcelain in Europe.
- Theodor Boveri: biologist, described Centrosome.
- Karlheinz Brandenburg: Inventor and audio engineer; father of audio compression format MPEG Audio Layer 3, more commonly known as MP3.
- Karl Ferdinand Braun: Inventor of the CRT oscilloscope in 1897. Braun contributed significantly to the development of radio and television technology: he shared with Guglielmo Marconi the 1909 Nobel Prize in Physics.
- Wernher von Braun: The preeminent rocket engineer of the 20th century. Developed the V-2 rocket for Germany. Built Saturn V rocket in USA which put man on the moon.
- Adolf Brix: developed the unit for specific gravity of liquids, degree Brix (°Bx).
- Korbinian Brodmann: neurologist, Brodmann area in brain
- Walter Bruch: PAL, colour encoding system for analogue television
- Friedrich Wilhelm Gustav Bruhn: Inventor of Taximeter
- Ernst Büchner: Chemist and inventor of Büchner flask and Büchner funnel.
- Robert Bunsen: Chemist who developed the Bunsen burner, and with Gustav Kirchhoff he invented the spectrometer (1859) and discovered caesium (1860) and rubidium (1861).
- Wilhelm Busch: Caricaturist, painter and poet; father of comics.
- Christian Friedrich Ludwig Buschmann: musical instrument maker. Pioneer and promoter of the harmonica.
- Adolf Busemann: aerospace engineer. Discovered the effect of swept wing for modern aircraft in 1935.
- Adolf Butenandt: biochemist. Discovered primary female sex hormones. Shared the Nobel Prize in Chemistry with Leopold Ruzicka in 1939.
- Heinrich Wilhelm Brandes: Founder of synoptic meteorology. As an astronomer, he was noted for demonstrating that meteors occur in the upper atmosphere and thus not really a meteorological phenomenon.
- Karl Friedrich Bonhoeffer: German chemist, who, together with Paul Harteck, discovered the spin isomers of hydrogen, orthohydrogen and parahydrogen in 1929.

== C ==
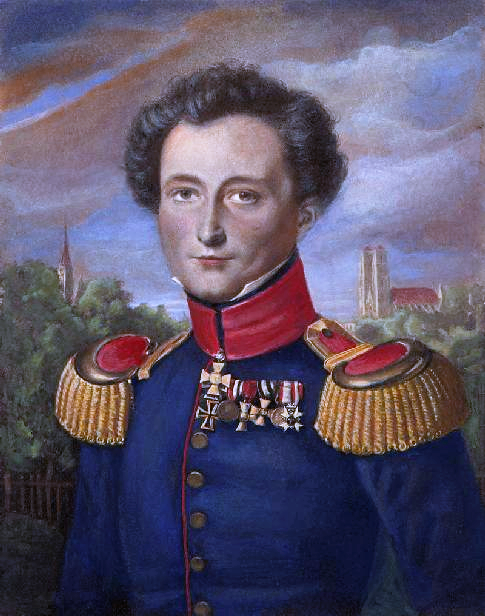
Carl von Clausewitz, father of modern military theory

- Georg Cantor: Mathematician, discoverer of the set theory (1870s), which has become a fundamental theory in mathematics.
- Ernst Boris Chain: biochemist, co-recipient of the Nobel Prize for Physiology or Medicine for his work on penicillin (together with Fleming).
- Carl von Clausewitz: The father of modern military theory.
- Rudolf Clausius: Mathematician and physicist known for the Second law of thermodynamics.
- Justus Claproth: Jurist and inventor of recyclable paper and deinking.
- Nicolaus Copernicus: Astronomer, formulated a heliocentric model of the universe which placed the Sun, rather than the Earth, at the centre.
- Manfred Curry: German American yachtsman, developed the cam cleat used on sailboats to easily and quickly secure a rope, discoverer of the pseudoscientific phenomenon of "geomagnetic lines" called the Curry Grid.

== D ==
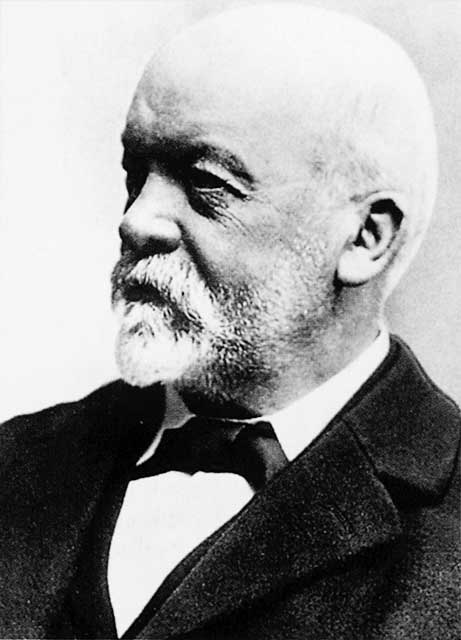
Gottlieb Daimler, co-founder of Mercedes-Benz

- Gottlieb Daimler: Invented the first high-speed internal combustion petrol engine and the first four-wheel automobile, also the first internal combustion motorcycle, the Reitwagen.
- Adolf "Adi" Dassler: Sports shoes with and without spikes; founder of Adidas.
- Rudolf Dassler: First sport shoes with screw-in shoe spikes, 1949; founder of Puma.
- Hans Georg Dehmelt: Physicist. Co-developed the non-magnetic quadrupole mass filter which laid the foundation for what we now call an ion trap. Shared the Nobel Prize in 1989.
- Max Delbrück: German American biophysicist. He was awarded the Nobel prize for discovering that bacteria become resistant to viruses (phages) as a result of genetic mutations.
- Johann Christoph Denner: Woodwind instrument maker, inventor of the clarinet.
- Jürgen Dethloff: Inventor and engineer, co-inventor of the Smart card (together with Helmut Gröttrup).
- Johann Friedrich Dieffenbach: Pioneer of skin transplantation and cosmetic surgery.
- Ernst Dickmanns: Developer of the first driverless car.
- Otto Diels: Diels–Alder reaction (together with Kurt Alder), a method for diene synthesis. The pair was awarded the Nobel Prize in Chemistry in 1950 for their work.
- Rudolf Diesel: Inventor of the diesel engine 1893.
- Johann Wolfgang Döbereiner, inventor of Döbereiner's lamp, 1823
- Gerhard Domagk: Discovery of what would become the first commercially available antibiotic.
- Christian Doppler: Discovered the Doppler effect.
- Walter Robert Dornberger: Co-inventor of the V-2 rocket.
- Karl Drais: Inventor of the bicycle and typewriter (1821) among other things.
- Peter Ferdinand Drucker: Invented the science of modern management.

== E ==
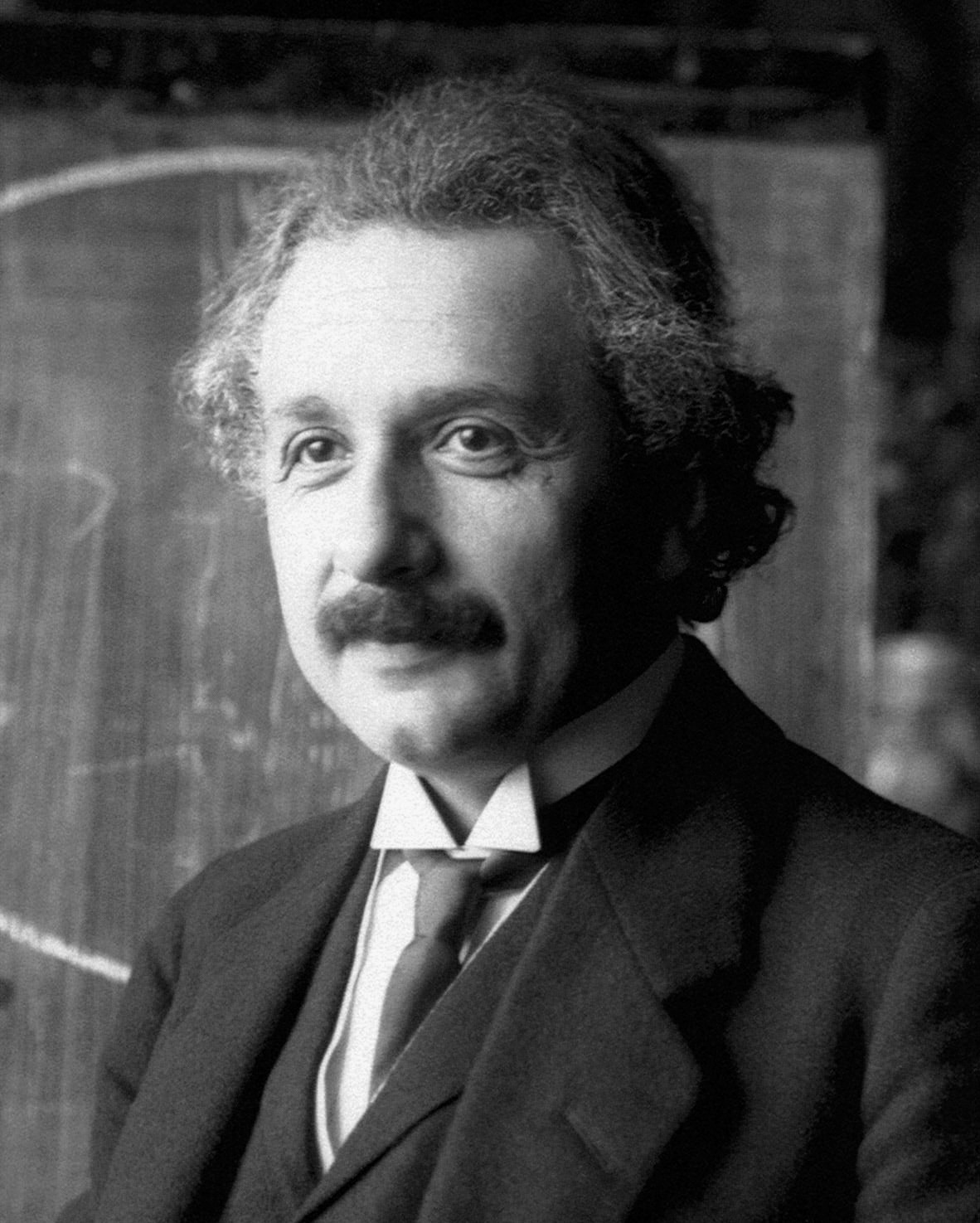
Albert Einstein in 1921, the year he was awarded the Nobel Prize in Physics

- Paul Ehrlich: Scientist in the fields of hematology, immunology, and chemotherapy, and Nobel laureate. Developed an effective treatment against syphilis.
- Caroline Eichler: Inventor, first woman to receive a patent (for her leg prosthesis)
- Albert Einstein: Father of Theoretical Physics, inventor and discoverer.
- Ludwig Elsbett: Developed new concepts for Diesel engines which drastically enhanced efficiency.
- Douglas Engelbart: German American inventor of the computer mouse.
- Evaristo Conrado Engelberg: Inventor in 1885 of a machine used to remove the husks from rice and coffee, the Engelberg huller.
- Friedrich Engels: He invented together with Karl Marx the economic and sociopolitical worldview Marxism.
- Joseph "Jo" Benedict Engl: German physicist and inventor who pioneered cinematographic technology in the early 1920s. The "Tonfilmprojektor" of Tri-Ergon is to date part of the permanent exhibition at the German Museum in Munich as one of Germany's major technological accomplishments.

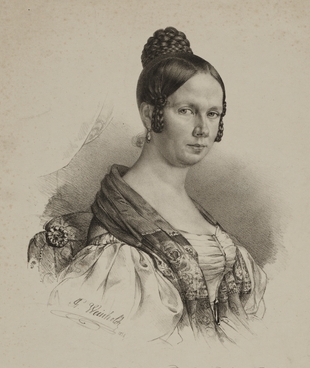
Inventor Caroline Eichler

- Hugo Erdmann: Chemist who discovered, together with his doctoral advisor Jacob Volhard, the Volhard-Erdmann cyclization. In 1898 he was the first who coined the term noble gas (the original noun is Edelgas in German).
- Hugo Erfurt: Ingrain wallpaper
- Emil Erlenmeyer: German chemist known for contributing to the early development of the theory of structure, formulating the Erlenmeyer rule, and designing the Erlenmeyer flask or the conical flask, a type of chemical flask, which is named after him.
- Gerhard Ertl: German physicist who laid the foundation of modern surface chemistry, which has helped explain how fuel cells produce energy without pollution, how catalytic converters clean up car exhausts and even why iron rusts, the Royal Swedish Academy of Sciences said. Nobel laureate as of 2007.
- Leonhard Euler: Swiss mathematician and physicist. One of the most influential mathematicians of the 18th century.

== F ==
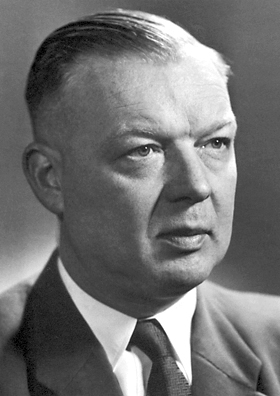
Werner Forssmann (1904–1979)

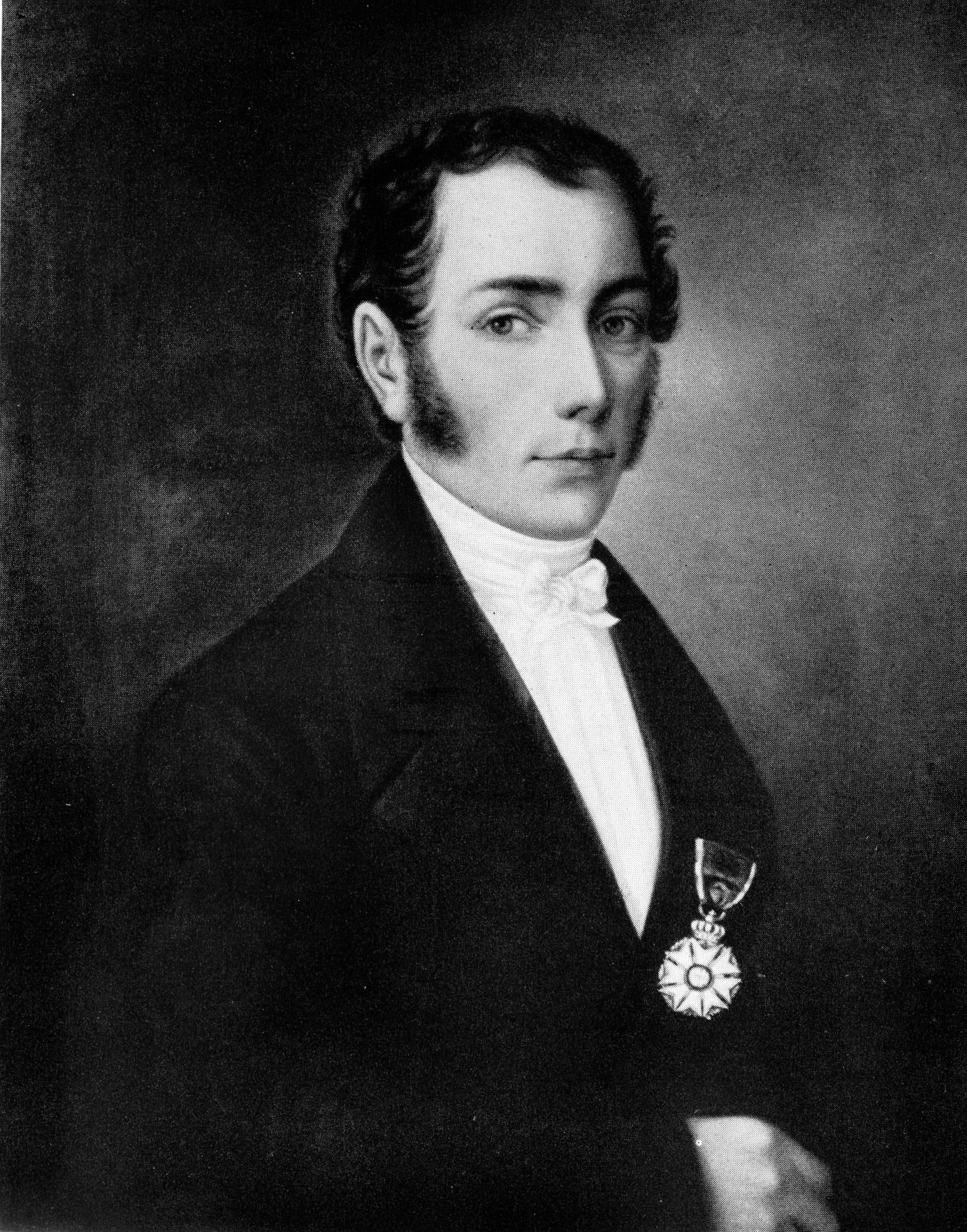
Joseph von Fraunhofer (1787–1826)

- Daniel Gabriel Fahrenheit: Fahrenheit, temperature scale, Fahrenheit hydrometer
- Gerd Faltings: Mathematician known for his work in arithmetic algebraic geometry, Fields Medal in 1986 for proving the Mordell conjecture.
- Otto Feick: Wheel gymnastics in 1925.
- Wilhelm Emil Fein: Invented the electrically driven hand drill in 1895.
- Adolf Gaston Eugen Fick: Glass Contact lenses
- Richard Fiedler: Invented the modern flamethrower in 1901.
- Artur Fischer: Invented the (split) wallplug made of plastic in 1958. He invented flash light photography. Fischer held over 1100 patents and currently holds the records for most patents for any single human, even more than Thomas Alva Edison. Further inventions are (bone-)plugs for fixing bone fractures and one of Fischer's most recent inventions is a gadget that makes it possible to hold and cut the top off an egg of any size.
- Hermann Emil Fischer: German chemist and 1902 recipient of the Nobel Prize in Chemistry. He discovered the Fischer esterification. He developed the Fischer projection, a symbolic way of drawing asymmetric carbon atoms. He is known for study of sugars & purines.
- Franz Fischer and Hans Tropsch: Invented a process in 1925 to turn coal into synthesis gas, and still further into liquid hydrocarbons. The process is a key component in modern gas to liquids processes.
- Wilhelm Rudolph Fittig: He discovered the pinacol coupling reaction, mesitylene, diacetyl and biphenyl.
- Irmgard Flügge-Lotz: She worked on what she called "discontinuous automatic control", which laid the foundation for automatic on-off aircraft control systems in jets.
- Werner Forssmann: Performed the first human cardiac catheterisation. Shared the Nobel Prize for Medicine 1956
- Joachim Frank: co-invented cryo-electron microscopy. Shared the Nobel Prize for Chemistry 2017
- Joseph von Fraunhofer: Discovery of the dark absorption lines known as Fraunhofer lines in the Sun's spectrum, which laid foundation for modern astronomy and astrophysics, and for making excellent optical glass and achromatic telescope lenses.
- Gottlob Frege: He is generally considered to be the father of analytic philosophy. Had influence on Carnap, Russell, and Wittgenstein
- Otto Frenzl: Aeronautical pioneer, developed the area rule in 1943, a design technique for airfoils used to reduce an aircraft's drag at transonic and supersonic speeds. Later it was independently developed again by Richard T. Whitcomb in 1952.
- Sigmund Freud: Neurologist who became known as the founding father of psychoanalysis.
- Nikolaus Friedreich: Discovery of Friedreich-Auerbach disease (together with Leopold Auerbach)
- Friedrich Fröbel: Pedagogue, who laid the foundation for modern education. He created the concept of the kindergarten.
- Klaus Fuchs: Theoretical physicist involved with the Manhattan Project; at the same time Soviet spy.
- Johann Carl Fuhlrott: Had the insight to recognize the Neanderthal bones for what they were: the remains of a previously unknown type of humans. He (together with Schaafhausen) is considered to be the father of paleoanthropology.

== G ==
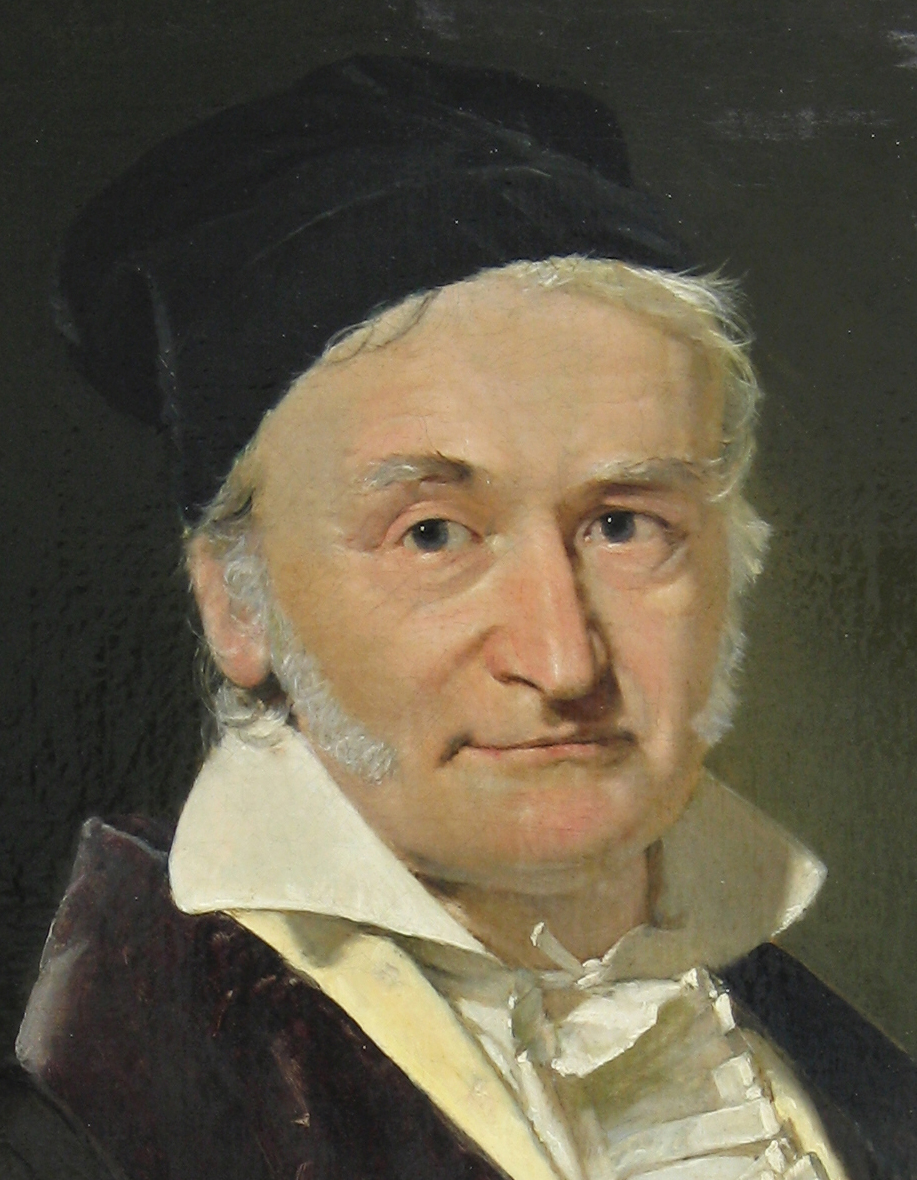
Carl Friedrich Gauss

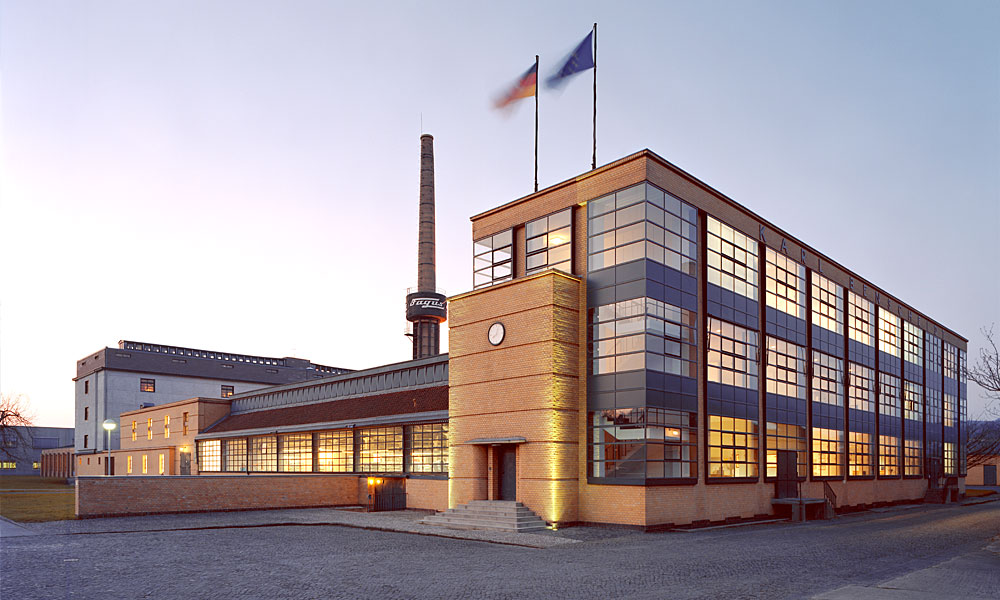
Fagus Factory, designed by Walter Gropius and Adolf Mayer

- Johann Galle: astronomer, discovery of planet Neptune
- Hermann Ganswindt: Inventor and spaceflight scientist, whose inventions (such as the dirigible, the helicopter, and the internal combustion engine) are thought to have been ahead of his time.
- Johann Carl Friedrich Gauss: German mathematician and physical scientist who contributed significantly to many fields, including number theory, statistics, analysis, differential geometry, geodesy, geophysics, electrostatics, astronomy and optics. Sometimes referred to as "the Prince of Mathematicians".
- Hans Geiger: Inventor of the Geiger–Müller counter in 1928. It detects the emission of nuclear radiation through the ionization produced in a low-pressure gas in a Geiger–Müller tube. Further improved by Walther Müller.
- Heinrich Geißler: Inventor of the Geissler tube.
- Reinhard Genzel: Astrophysicist, he and his group were the first to track the motions of stars at the centre of the Milky Way and show that they were orbiting a very massive object, probably a supermassive black hole.
- Walter Gerlach: Physicist who co-discovered spin quantization in a magnetic field, the Stern–Gerlach effect.
- Edmund Germer: Inventor of the neon lamp (Neonlampe).
- Max Giese: Inventor of the first concrete pump in 1928.
- Heinrich Göbel: Inventor of Hemmer for Sewing Machines, 1865, Vacuum Pump (Improvement of the Geissler-System of vacuum pumps, 1881 and Electric Incandescent Lamp (sockets to connect the filament of carbon and the conducting wires), 1882
- Kurt Gödel: Important discoveries in math and logic, such as the incompleteness theorems

Johannes Gutenberg in a 16th-century copper engraving

- Maria Goeppert-Mayer: Physicist. Nobel laureate in Physics 1963 for proposing the nuclear shell model of the atomic nucleus together with J. Hans D. Jensen. The unit for the two-photon absorption cross section is named the Goeppert-Mayer (GM) unit.
- Konrad Grebe: Coal-machine (Kohlenhobel)
- Heinrich Greinacher: German-Swiss physicist. He is regarded as an original experimenter and is the developer of the magnetron and the Greinacher multiplier; Cockcroft-Walton-Generator in 1914.
- Brothers Grimm: Academic pioneers of philology, linguistics, and storytelling. Worked together on the most comprehensive dictionary of the German language Deutsches Wörterbuch. Jacob Grimm: Philologist and linguist. Described first what is now known as Grimm's law, the first scientific research into sound change in 1822.
- Georg Friedrich Grotefend: Deciphering of cuneiform
- Alexander Grothendieck: Mathematician and the central figure behind the creation of the modern theory of algebraic geometry; Fields Medalist (1966).
- Helmut Gröttrup: smart card (together with Jürgen Dethloff)
- Walter Gropius: Pioneer of modern architecture. Founder of the Bauhaus. First modern industrial building designed in 1910.
- Peter Grünberg: Physicist. Discovered giant magnetoresistance with Albert Fert. The discovery is used in gigabyte hard disk drives for computers. Nobel laureate 2007.
- Heinz Guderian: The father of modern mechanized warfare, inventor of the Blitzkrieg strategy.
- Otto von Guericke: Groundbreaking research into air pressure. Invented the vacuum pump in 1650.
- Beno Gutenberg: Together with American Charles Francis Richter he invented Richter magnitude scale.
- Johannes Gutenberg: Inventor of the technology of printing with movable type in 1439. The first book so printed was the Gutenberg Bible.
- Aristid von Grosse: He was able to isolate protactinium oxide and was later able to produce metallic protactinium by decomposition of protactinium iodide.
- Johann Rudolf Glauber: German-Dutch alchemist who was one of the first chemical engineers. His discovery of sodium sulfate in 1625 led to the compound being named after him: "Glauber's salt".

== H ==
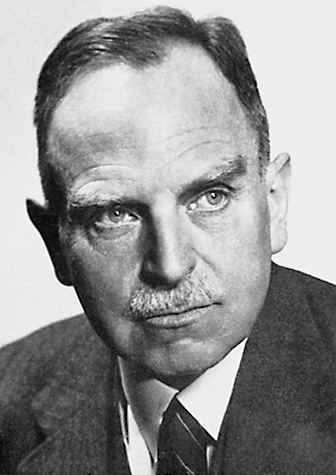
Otto Hahn, the first man to split the atomic nucleus

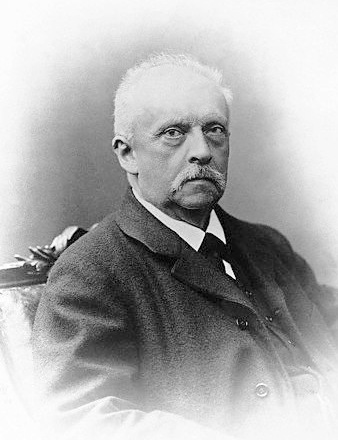
Hermann von Helmholtz

- Fritz Haber: German chemist and Nobel laureate who pioneered synthetic ammonia and chemical warfare.
- Theodor W. Hänsch: Physicist, developed laser-based precision spectroscopy further to determine optical frequency extremely accurately. Nobel laureate in 2005.
- Otto Hahn: German chemist and Nobel laureate who pioneered the fields of radioactivity and radiochemistry. Considered to be "the father of nuclear chemistry" and the "founder of the atomic age". Discovered many isotopes, Protactinium and nuclear fission.
- Samuel Hahnemann: Physician, best known for creating a system of alternative medicine called homeopathy.
- Harald zur Hausen: Virologist, discovered the role of papilloma viruses in the development of cervical cancer. His research made the development of a vaccine against papilloma possible, which will drastically reduce cervical cancer in future. Nobel laureate as of 2008.
- Werner Heisenberg: Theoretical physicist who made fundamental contributions to quantum mechanics. Discovered a particle's position and velocity cannot be known at the same time. Discovered atomic nuclei are made of protons and neutrons.
- Wolfgang Helfrich: Co-inventor of Twisted nematic field effect.
- Rudolf Hell: Inventor of an early printer and fax machine (Hellschreiber).
- Richard Hellmann: Hellmann's (Blue Ribbon) Mayonnaise, 1905.

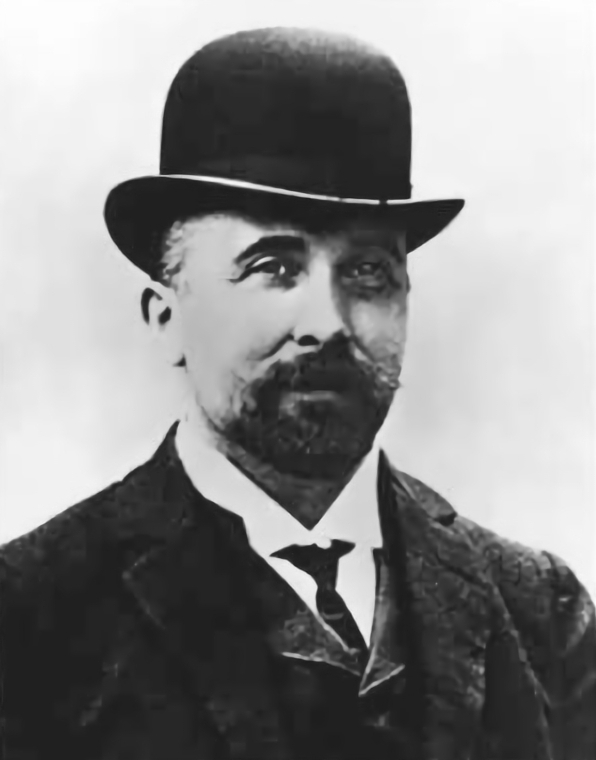
Felix Hoffmann

- Hermann von Helmholtz: Discovered the principle of conservation of energy.
- Peter Henlein: Inventor of the portable watch.
- Friedrich Wilhelm Herschel (William Herschel): Discovered the planet Uranus and infrared radiation among other things.
- Heinrich Hertz: Physicist, Discoverer of electromagnetic/radio waves.
- Otto Herzog: First use of the Carabiner in mountain climbing which substantially enhanced security for mountaineers.
- Victor Francis Hess: Discovered Cosmic rays. Also won the Nobel Prize.
- David Hilbert: Influential mathematician who discovered and developed a broad range of fundamental ideas in math.
- Albert Hofmann: German-Swiss; Discovered the chemical properties of chitin and lysergic acid diethylamide.
- Fritz Hofmann: Inventor of the method of artificial rubber production
- Wilhelm Hofmeister: Discovery of the Alternation of generations
- Felix Hoffmann: Isolated acetylsalicylic acid, a painkiller marketed under the name Aspirin (Bayer), 1897. In some English speaking countries marketed under the name disprin.
- Herman Hollerith: a German American statistician who developed a mechanical tabulator based on punched cards
- Gottlob Honold: Inventor of the spark plug and the modern internal combustion engine, as well as headlights.
- Horten brothers: Designed some of the most advanced aircraft of the 1930s and '40s, including the world's first jet-powered flying wing, the Horten Ho 229.
- Christian Hülsmeyer: German inventor of the Telemobilskop, a radio-based detector of remote objects; a 1904 precursor of radar.
- Alexander von Humboldt: Naturalist and explorer. His quantitative work on botanical geography was foundational to the field of biogeography.
- Wilhelm von Humboldt: Originator of the linguistic relativity hypothesis.
- Erich Huzenlaub: Huzenlaub Process for parboiling
- Johannes Heidenhain: Invented the Metallur process. This lead-sulfide copying process made it possible for the first time to make exact copies of an original grating on a metal surface for industrial use. By 1943, Heidenhain was producing linear scales with accuracy of ± 15 μm and circular scale disks with accuracy of ± 3 angular seconds.
- Karl Andreas Hofmann: German inorganic chemist who is best known for his discovery of a family of clathrates which consist of a 2-D metal cyanide sheet, with every second metal also bound axially to two other ligands. These materials have been named 'Hofmann clathrates' in his honour.

== I ==
- Ernst Ising: physicist who developed Ising model.
- Otmar Issing: Economist who invented the "pepet pillar" decision algorithm now used by the ECB.

== J ==
- J. Hans D. Jensen: Nuclear physicist, proposed the nuclear shell model, shared 1963 Nobel Prize in Physics.
- Hugo Junkers: Pioneer of all-metal aircraft construction with the Junkers J 1 (1915–16).

== K ==
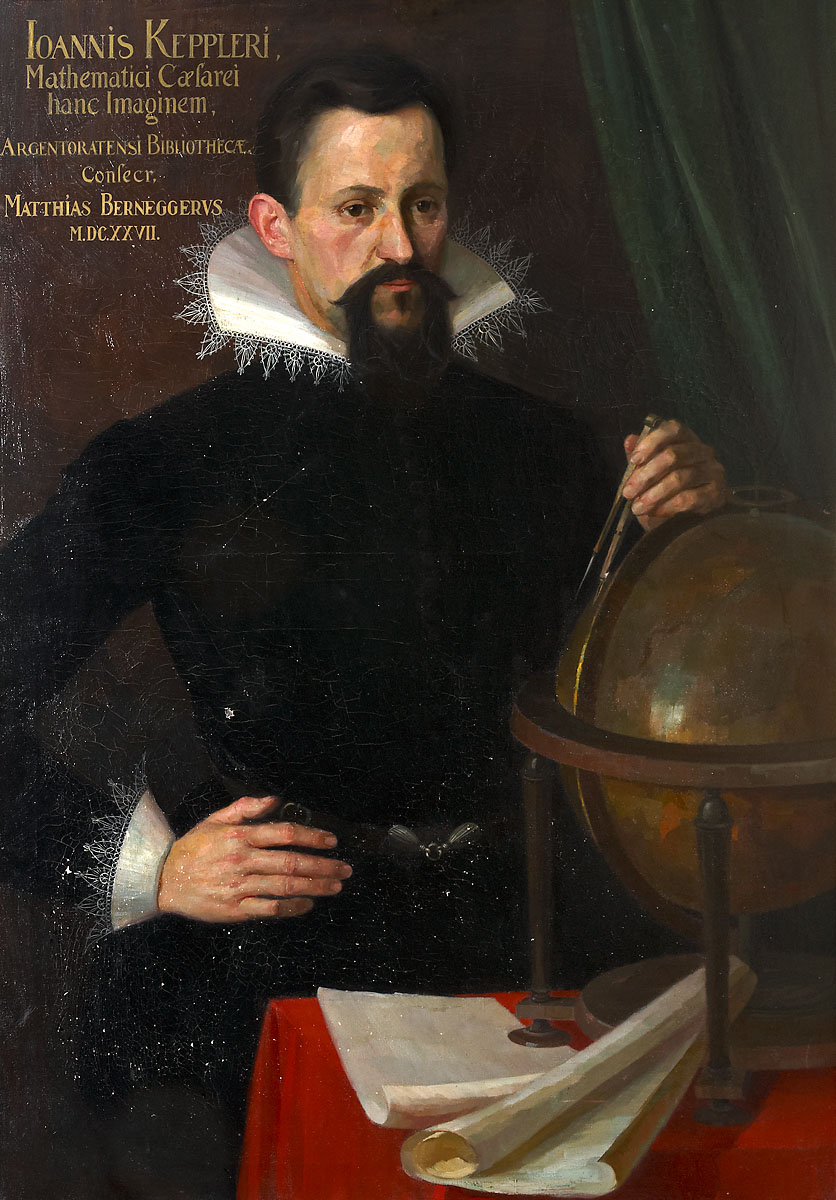
Johannes Kepler

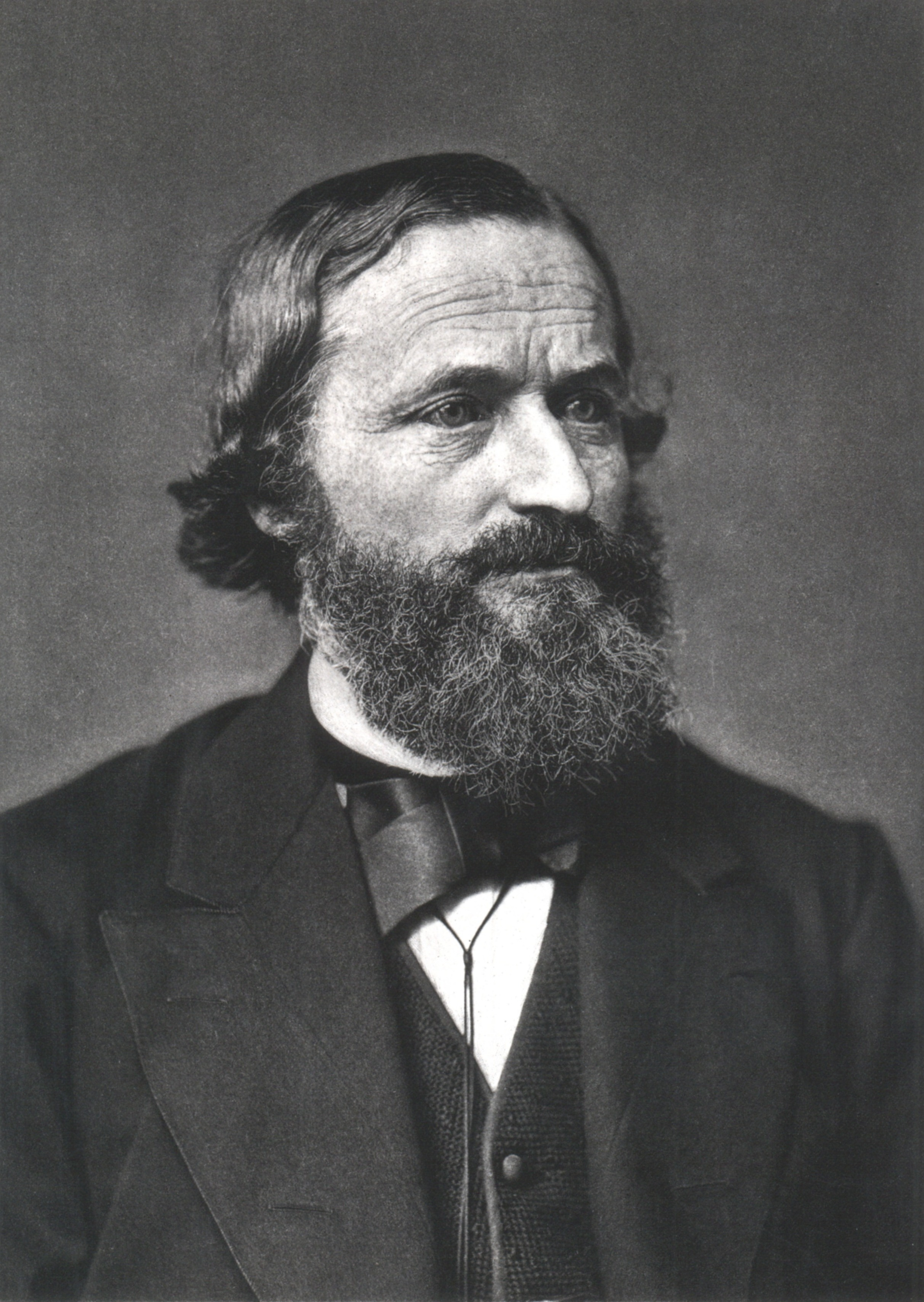
Gustav Kirchhoff

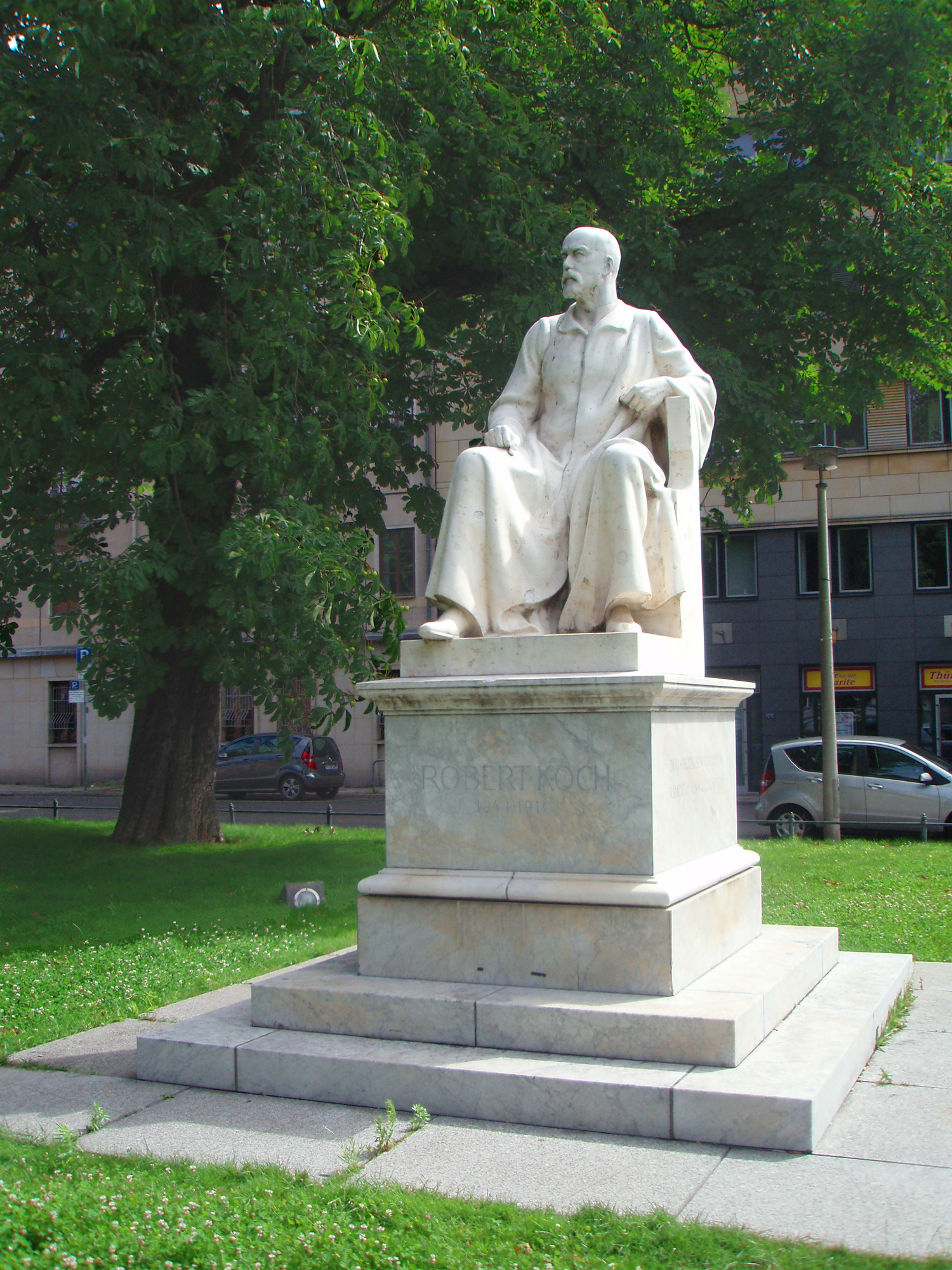
Monument to Robert Koch on his name square in Berlin

- Ferdinand Adolf Kehrer : Introduction of the transverse incision technique to minimize bleeding by modern Caesarean section
- Donald J. Kessler: Astrophysicist, known for developing the Kessler syndrome.
- Hermann Kemper: Invented the magnetic levitation train. Patent granted in 1934.
- Johannes Kepler: Discovered the laws of planetary motion.
- Wolfgang Ketterle: German-American physicist who developed an "atom laser", amongst other breakthroughs. Nobel laureate 2001.
- Erhard Kietz: Pioneer discoverer of video technology.
- Gustav Kirchhoff: Discovery of the principles upon which spectroscopy is founded. He contributed to the fundamental understanding of electrical circuits, spectroscopy, and the emission of black-body radiation by heated objects. He coined the term "black body" radiation in 1862, and two different sets of concepts (one in circuit theory, and one in spectroscopy) are named "Kirchhoff's laws" after him; there is also a Kirchhoff's Law in thermochemistry. The Bunsen–Kirchhoff Award for spectroscopy is named after him and his colleague, Robert Bunsen, who both invented the spectrometer in 1859.
- Martin Heinrich Klaproth: Discovered the element Uranium.
- Klaus von Klitzing: Physicist, known for discovery of the integer quantum Hall effect, 1985 Nobel Prize in Physics.
- Ludwig Knorr: Chemist, who together with Carl Paal, discovered the Paal-Knorr synthesis, and the Knorr quinoline synthesis and Knorr pyrrole synthesis.
- Robert Koch: Physician, discoverer, inventor and Nobel Prize winner. He became famous for isolating Bacillus anthracis (1877), the tuberculosis bacillus (1882), and Vibrio cholerae (1883), and for his development of Koch's postulates.
- Friedrich Koenig: first functional steam-powered printing press with his colleague Andreas Friedrich Bauer)
- Alfred Körte and Gustav Körte: discovered Gordium, 1900
- Franz Kolb: Plasticine
- Arthur Korn: Inventor involved in development of the fax machine, specifically the transmission of photographs or telephotography, known as the Bildtelegraph.
- Albrecht Kossel: determining the chemical composition of nucleic acids
- Max Kramer: Aircraft engineer. Developed the first operational guided bomb in 1942/43. This first smart bomb was radio controlled and joy-stick operated.
- Hans Adolf Krebs: discovered two important chemical reactions in the body, namely the urea cycle and the citric acid cycle.
- Wilhelm Krische: Galalith
- Julius H. Kroehl: Inventor and engineer, who built the first functioning submarine in the world.
- Herbert Kroemer: Physicist, shared the Nobel Prize in Physics 2000 for developing semiconductor heterostructures used in high-speed- and opto-electronics.
- Werner Krüger: Developed the Krueger flap, a lift enhancement device in modern aircraft wings in 1943.
- Alfred Krupp: Pioneer in metal casting and metal working process and procedures.
- Adam Johann von Krusenstern: Navigator and explorer, led the first Russian expedition to circumnavigate the Earth.
- Dietrich Küchemann: Aeronautical pioneer, developed wings for supersonic speed, such as delta wings as used in the Concorde.
- Heinz Kunert: Defogger for automobiles.
- Felix Klein: Invented the Erlangen Program, classifying geometries by their underlying symmetry groups, was a highly influential synthesis of much of the mathematics of the day. Also invented the Klein bottle, Beltrami-Klein model and wrote Klein's encyclopedia.

== L ==
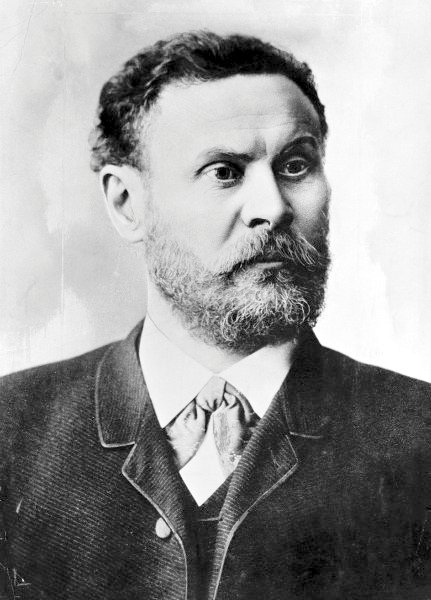
Otto Lilienthal

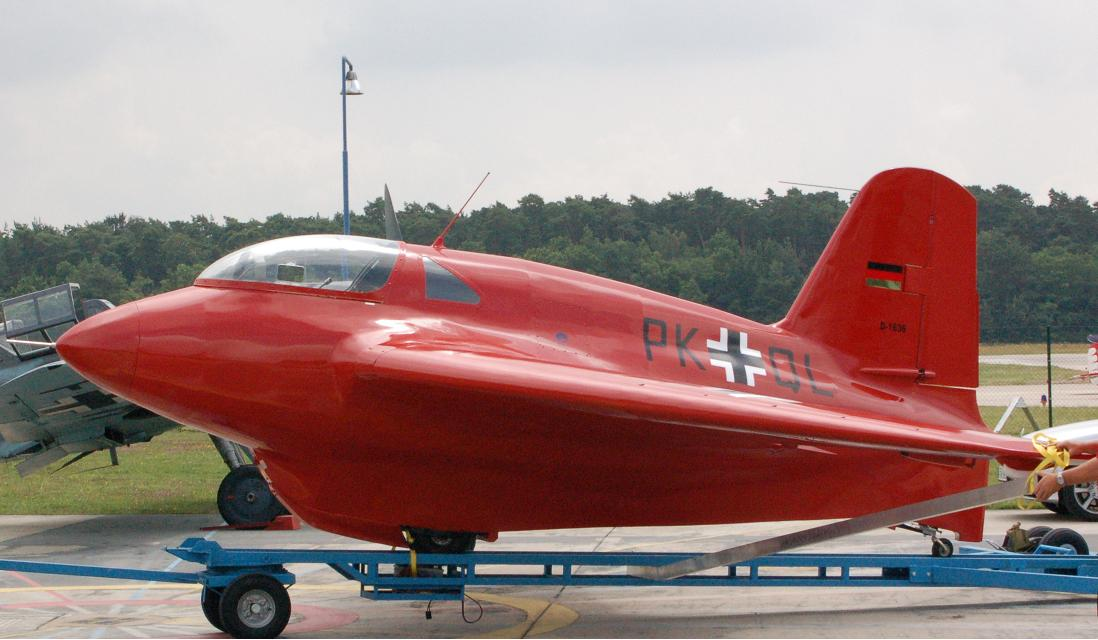
Me 163 replica designed by Alexander Lippisch

- Albert Ladenburg: isolated hyoscine
- Eugen Langen: Entrepreneur, engineer and inventor, involved in the development of the petrol engine and the Wuppertal monorail.
- Paul Langerhans: Islets of Langerhans, Langerhans cells
- Max von Laue: Discoveries regarding the diffraction of X-rays in crystals.
- Ernst Lecher: He is remembered for developing an apparatus— "Lecher lines"—to measure the wavelength and frequency of electromagnetic waves.
- Gottfried Wilhelm Leibniz: Philosopher known for discovering the mathematical field of calculus and coherently laying down its basic operations in 1684. The modern binary number system, the basis for binary code, was invented by Gottfried Leibniz in 1679 and appears in his article Explication de l'Arithmétique Binaire.
- Emil Lerp: inventor of transportable gasoline chainsaw, 1927
- Georg Christoph Lichtenberg: German scientist credited with the development of the electrophorus. he is remembered for his posthumously published notebooks, which he himself called Sudelbücher, a description modeled on the English bookkeeping term "scrapbooks", and for his discovery of the strange tree-like electrical discharge patterns now called Lichtenberg figures.
- Justus von Liebig: German chemist who made contributions to agricultural and biological chemistry.
- Otto Lilienthal: Father of Aviation and first successful aviator. Main discovery was the properties and shape of the wing.
- Carl von Linde: Engineer who, among other things, developed refrigeration and gas separation technologies.
- Alexander Lippisch: Pioneer of aerodynamics, his most famous design is the Messerschmitt Me 163.
- Ernst Litfaß: free-standing cylindrical advertising column.
- Friedrich Loeffler: discovered the organism causing diphtheria (Corynebacterium diphtheriae) and the cause of foot-and-mouth disease (Aphthovirus). His description of the diphtheria bacillus, published in 1884.
- Johann Benedict Listing: German mathematician who was a doctoral student under Carl Friedrich Gauss, he first introduced the term "topology", in a famous article published in 1847, although he had used the term in correspondence some years earlier. He (independently) discovered the properties of the half-twisted strip at the same time (1858) as August Ferdinand Möbius, and went further in exploring the properties of strips with higher-order twists (paradromic rings). He discovered topological invariants which came to be called Listing numbers. He also framed the Listing's law.
- Hans Luedtke: German organist, musicologist and inventor who developed "Oskalyd" extended organs and keyboards with hexagonal keys arranged like honeycombs.

== M ==
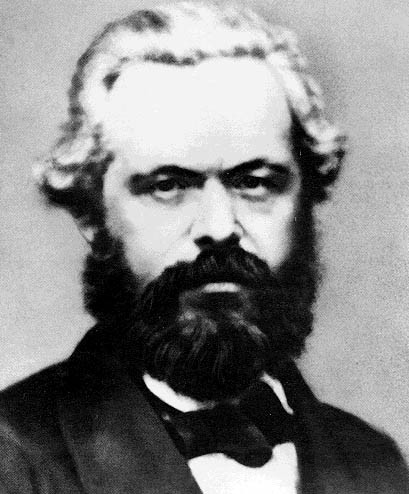
Karl Marx

- Maria Goeppert-Mayer: Maria Goeppert Mayer was a German-born American theoretical physicist, and Nobel laureate in Physics for proposing the nuclear shell model of the atomic nucleus. She was the second woman to win a Nobel Prize in physics, after Marie Curie
- Georg Hans Madelung: Academic and aeronautical engineer; a participant in the development of the Junkers F.13.
- Karl Marx: Political economist and philosopher, who defined the political/economical background of capitalism and discovered the mechanics of Marxism.
- J. Heinrich Matthaei: Together with Marshall Nirenberg, they show that a sequence of nucleotide can encode particular amino acid, laying the foundations for deciphering the genetic code.
- Wilhelm Maybach: Together with Gottlieb Daimler the first gasoline-powered motorcycle, power-engine boat and later, 1902, the Mercedes car model.
- Ottomar von Mayenburg: Inventor of "Chlorodont", the first commercial brand of toothpaste.
- Georg Meissner: Discovered Meissner's plexus.
- Lise Meitner: Nuclear physicist, who, together with Otto Frisch, provided a theoretical account of nuclear fission.
- Julius Lothar Meyer: With Mendeleev he developed the periodic classification of the elements in order of their atomic weight.
- Christian Erich Hermann von Meyer: He discovered the Triassic predator Teratosaurus, the earliest bird Archaeopteryx lithographica (1861), the pterosaur Rhamphorhynchus, and the prosauropod dinosaur Plateosaurus
- Gregor Mendel: Discoveries in genetics. Mendel demonstrated that the inheritance of certain traits in pea plants follows particular patterns, now referred to as the laws of Mendelian inheritance. First published in 1865.
- Ottmar Mergenthaler: Inventor who has been called a second Gutenberg because of his invention of the Linotype machine.
- Otto Metzger: Inventor of an impact-extrusion process for forming seamless zinc and brass cans.
- Rudolf Mössbauer: physicist, discovered Mössbauer effect, shared Nobel Prize in Physics 1961.
- Johannes Peter Müller: Discoveries in physiology.
- August Ferdinand Möbius: German mathematician and theoretical astronomer. He is best known for his discovery of the Möbius strip, independently discovered by Johann Benedict Listing around the same time. The Möbius configuration, formed by two mutually inscribed tetrahedra, is also named after him. Möbius was the first to introduce homogeneous coordinates into projective geometry. Many mathematical concepts are named after him, including the Möbius plane, the Möbius transformations, important in projective geometry, and the Möbius transform of number theory. His interest in number theory led to the important Möbius function μ(n) and the Möbius inversion formula. In Euclidean geometry, he systematically developed the use of signed angles and line segments as a way of simplifying and unifying results.
- Karl Mollweide: German mathematician and astronomer. In trigonometry, he discovered the formula known as Mollweide's formula. He invented a map projection called the Mollweide projection.
- Walther Meissner: He established the world's third largest helium-liquifier, and discovered in 1933 the Meissner effect, damping of the magnetic field in superconductors.

== N ==
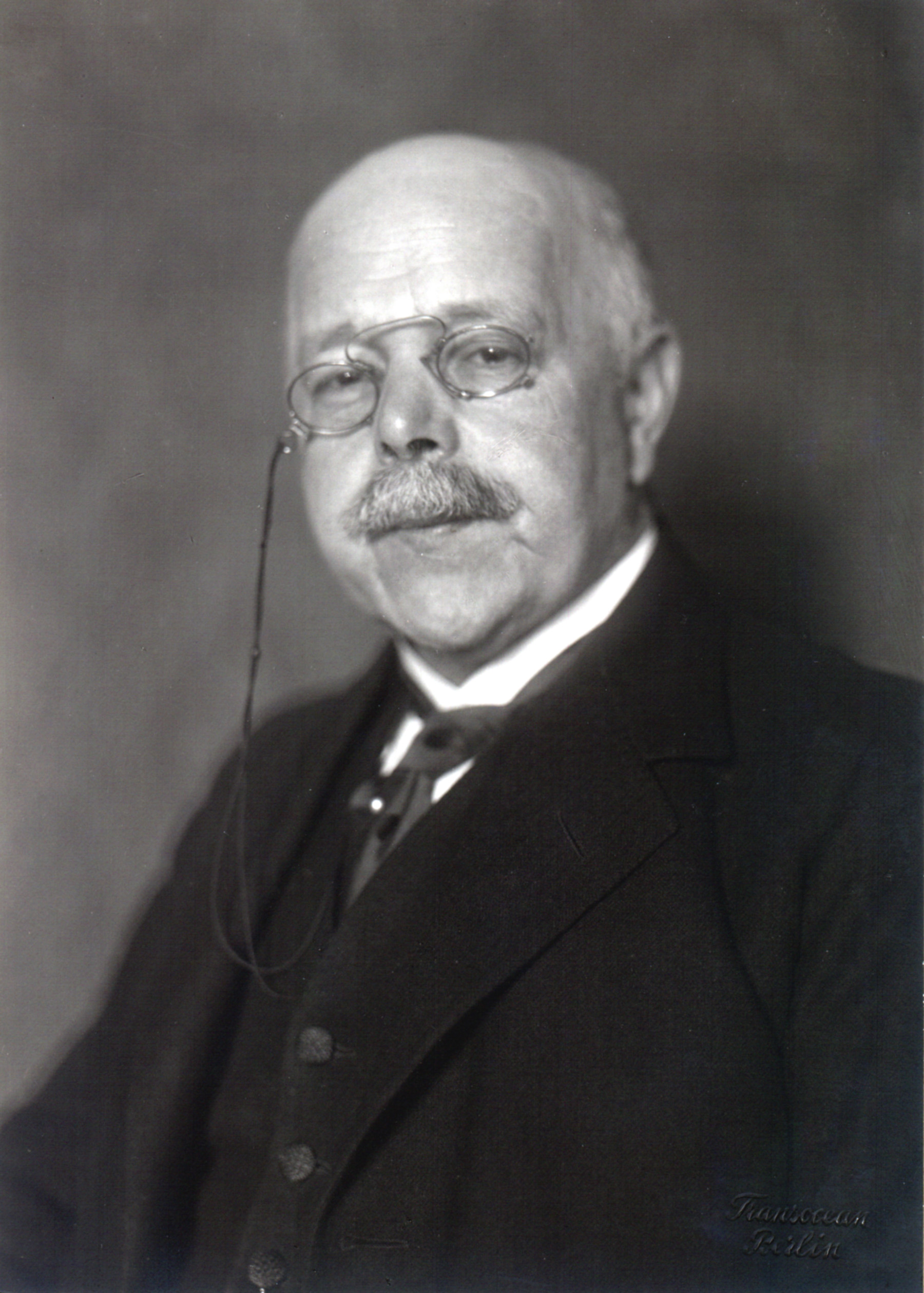
Walther Nernst, Nobel laureate

- Thomas Nast: The German American "Father of the American Cartoon".
- Walther Nernst: Inventor of the Nernst lamp and Nobel laureate 1920 in Chemistry.
- Karl Nessler: Inventor of the permanent wave.
- Paul Gottlieb Nipkow: Technician and inventor, the "spiritual father" of the core element of first generation television technology.
- Emmy Noether: Mathematician. Groundbreaking contributions to abstract algebra and theoretical physics (Noether's theorem). Considered by many as the most influential woman in the history of mathematics.

== O ==
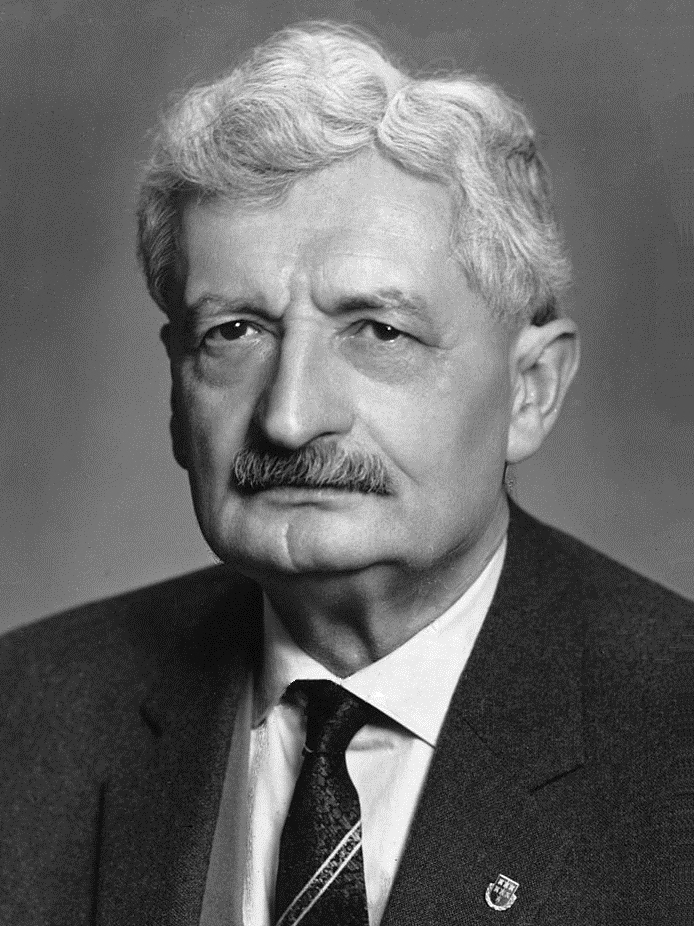
Hermann Oberth

- Hermann Oberth: Pioneer of rocket science and discoverer of the Oberth effect.
- Georg Ohm: physicist and mathematician, discoverer of the Ohm's law and Ohm's acoustic law
- August Oetker: Pharmacist. He was the first to sell baking powder in small packets to households instead of bakeries (as others before him) and thus made it the popular product we know today.
- Hans Joachim Pabst von Ohain: The modern jet engine in 1933, patented in 1936. Frank Whittle had developed a similar concept independently in 1928/1929.
- Wilhelm Ostwald: German chemist who received the Nobel Prize in Chemistry in 1909 for his work on catalysis, chemical equilibria and reaction velocities. Ostwald, Jacobus Henricus van 't Hoff, and Svante Arrhenius are usually credited with being the modern founders of the field of physical chemistry.
- Nicolaus August Otto: Inventor of the first internal-combustion engine to efficiently burn fuel directly in a piston chamber.

== P ==
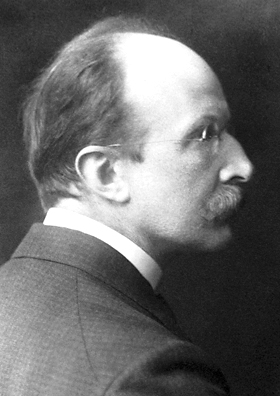
Max Planck

- Wolfgang Paul: Physicist. Co-developed the non-magnetic quadrupole mass filter which laid the foundation for what we now call an ion trap. Shared the Nobel Prize in 1989.
- Hans von Pechmann: Chemist, renowned for his discovery of diazomethane in 1894. Pechmann condensation and Pechmann pyrazole synthesis.
- Rudolf Peierls: nuclear physicist.
- Julius Richard Petri: Bacteriologist who is generally credited with inventing the Petri dish while working as assistant to Robert Koch.
- Emil Pfeiffer: Discovery of Infectious mononucleosis
- Fritz Pfleumer: Inventor of magnetic tape for recording sound. He built the world's first practical tape recorder, called Magnetophon K1.
- Joseph Pilates: inventor of the physical fitness system named after him: Pilates
- Max Planck: Physicist, Scientist. He is considered to be the founder of the quantum theory, and one of the most important physicists of the twentieth century.
- Robert Wichard Pohl: In 1938, together with Rudolf Hilsch, built first functioning solid-state amplifier using salt as the semiconductor.
- Ludwig Prandtl: First to explain the boundary layer and its importance for drag and streamlining in aircraft in 1904. He established and headed the Aerodynamische Versuchsanstalt in Göttingen, now Max Planck Institute for Dynamics and Self-Organization. During his tenure the first wind tunnel in Germany was built here, thereby establishing a specific design for wind tunnels (Göttingen type).
- Johann Friedrich Pfaff: One of Germany's most eminent mathematicians during the 19th century. He studied mathematical series and integral calculus, and is noted for his work on partial differential equations of the first order (Pfaffian systems as they are now called) which became part of the theory of differential forms.
- Julius Plücker: Framed the Plücker formula. He made fundamental contributions to the field of analytical geometry and was a pioneer in the investigations of cathode rays that led eventually to the discovery of the electron. He also vastly extended the study of Lamé curves.
- Harald Popp: Inventor and audio engineer; father of audio compression format MPEG Audio Layer 3, more commonly known as MP3.

== R ==
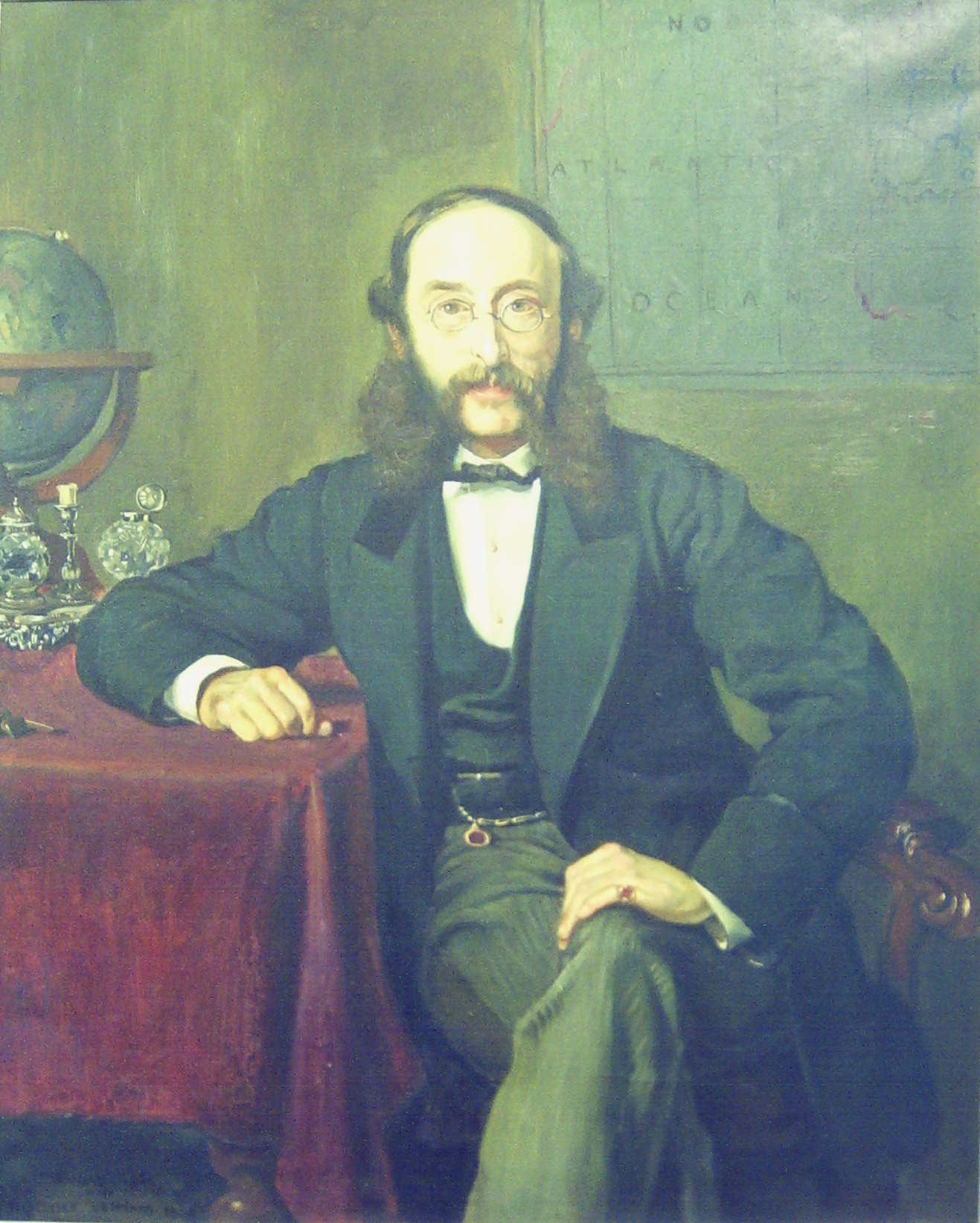
Paul Reuter aged 53 years (1869) by artist Rudolf Lehmann

- Adolf Rambold: Inventor of modern tea bag.
- Johann Philipp Reis: Inventor of the first phone transmitter in 1861, he also invented the term Telephone.
- Josef Rodenstock: Founder of Rodenstock, manufacturer of optical systems, ophthalmic lenses and spectacles frames.
- Ralf Reski: Moss bioreactor (1998).
- Paul Julius Freiherr von Reuter: Communications pioneer.
- Fritz Reiche: Was a student of Max Planck and a colleague of Albert Einstein, who was active in, and made important contributions to the early development of quantum mechanics including co-authoring the Thomas-Reiche-Kuhn sum rule.
- Hans Reichel: Musical instrument inventor. Inventor of the daxophone and various overtone guitars.
- Bernhard Riemann: Mathematician, who made lasting contributions to analysis, number theory, and differential geometry.
- Johann Wilhelm Ritter: Physicist and discoverer of Ultraviolet.
- Wilhelm Conrad Röntgen: Physicist and discoverer of x-rays/Röntgen rays (8 November 1895), this earned him the first Nobel Prize in Physics in 1901.
- Arthur Rudolph: Rocket engineer who, together with Wernher von Braun, played a key role in the development of the V-2 rocket.
- Heinrich Daniel Ruhmkorff: German instrument maker who commercialized the induction coil (often referred to as the Ruhmkorff coil).
- Ernst Ruska: Physicist, developed the first electron microscope in 1933. Nobel laureate 1986.
- Karl Wilhelm Rosenmund: He discovered the Rosenmund reduction, which is the reduction of acyl chlorides to aldehydes over palladium-on-carbon catalyst. The Rosenmund-von Braun reaction, the conversion of an aryl bromide to an arylnitrile is also named after him.

== S ==
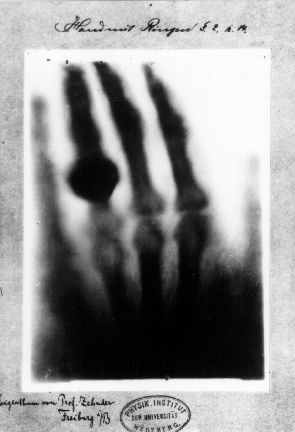
Hand mit Ringen: print of Wilhelm Conrad Röntgen's first "medical" x-ray, of his wife's hand, taken on 22 December 1895 and presented to Professor Ludwig Zehnder of the Physik Institut, University of Freiburg, on 1 January 1896

- Carl Wilhelm Scheele: Oxygen (although Joseph Priestley published his findings first), identification of molybdenum, tungsten, barium, hydrogen and chlorine
- Arthur Scherbius: Developed the mechanical cipher machine Enigma. Patent granted in 1918.
- Wilhelm Schickard: mechanical calculator in 1623.
- Paul Schlack: Invented Nylon 6.
- Friedrich Albert Moritz Schlick: Was a German philosopher, physicist and the founding father of logical positivism and the Vienna Circle.
- Heinrich Schliemann: One of the fathers of modern archaeology, among other things he discovered Homeric Troy.
- Hugo Schmeisser: Developed the first modern assault rifle StG 44 in 1942.
- Bernhard Schmidt: Developed a photographic telescope with minimal optical errors: the Schmidt camera.
- Paul Schmidt: Developed since 1928 his idea of a new drive, the "pulsating incineration", also used in the V-1 flying bomb (engine was called "Argus-Schmidtrohr"); pulsejet was a development by Schmidt.
- Christian Friedrich Schönbein: Professor Schönbein is credited with four scientific advances: Ozone, Gun cotton, Collodion and Fuel cell
- Johann Lukas Schönlein: Professor of medicine, he discovered among other things the parasitic cause of ringworm or favus (Achorion Schönleinii).

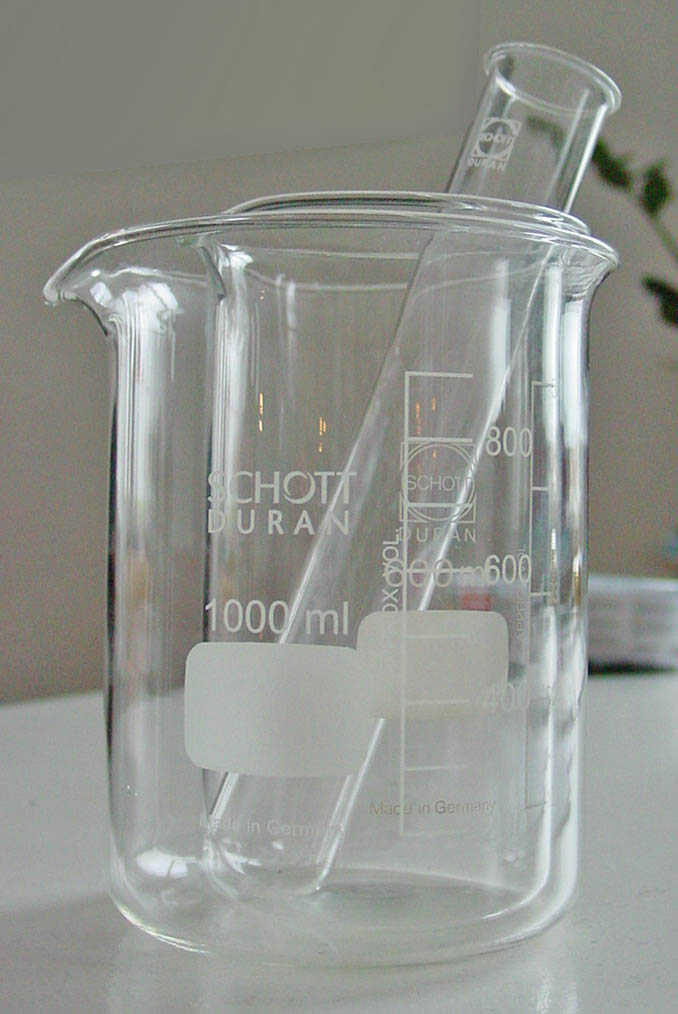
Borosilicate glass as used in chemical labs - Type 3.3 according to (DIN ISO 3585)

- Otto Schoetensack: Named the Homo heidelbergensis.
- Otto Schott: Inventor of borosilicate glass. Donated his shares in the company Carl Zeiss to form Carl-Zeiss-Stiftung, still in existence today.
- Walter H. Schottky: Played a major early role in developing the theory of electron and ion emission phenomena, invented the screen-grid vacuum tube and the pentode.
- Johannes Heinrich Schultz: developed the desensitization-relaxation technique called Autogenic training.
- Marx Schwab: Silversmith, invented coining with the screw press around 1550.
- Theodor Schwann: Discovery of properties of cells in animals.
- Karl Schwarzschild: astronomer, Schwarzschild metric, Deriving the Schwarzschild solution, Schwarzschild radius
- Alois Senefelder: He invented the printing technique of lithography in 1796.
- Friedrich Sertürner: First to isolate morphine from the opium poppy in 1803/1804, discovering morphine.
- Philipp Franz von Siebold: Physician and naturalist, detailed description and collection of the Japanese flora and fauna. Introduced Western medicine to Japan and opened a medical school.
- Ernst Werner von Siemens: Dynamo, pointer telegraph that used a needle to point to the right letter, first electric elevator, trolleybus.
- Max Skladanowsky: Bioscop, German inventor and early filmmaker.
- Friedrich Soennecken: Invented Hole punch and ring binder.
- Arnold Sommerfeld: Theoretical physicist who pioneered developments in atomic and quantum physics.
- Johannes Stark: Discovery of the Doppler effect in canal rays and the splitting of spectral lines in electric fields" (the latter is known as the Stark effect).
- Jack Steinberger: German-American-Swiss physicist, co-discovered the muon neutrino, shared 1988 Nobel Prize in Physics.
- Georg Wilhelm Steller: Chief naturalist on Vitus Bering's expedition during which Alaska was discovered (1741) and pioneer of Alaskan Natural History. Steller's sea cow (now extinct) was named after him.
- Otto Stern: Nobel laureate; contributed to the discovery of spin quantization in the Stern–Gerlach experiment with Walther Gerlach in 1922.
- Heinrich Stölzel: Developed the valve for brass instruments which is used today in 1818. Friedrich Blühmel had made a similar development independently at the same time.
- Horst Ludwig Störmer: German-American physicist. Shared the Nobel Prize in 1998 for the discovery of a new form of quantum fluid with fractionally charged excitations.
- Levi Strauss: The German American father of blue jeans.
- Ernst Stromer: Discovery and Describing of Aegyptosaurus, Bahariasaurus, Carcharodontosaurus, and the largest known theropod, Spinosaurus aegyptiacus. Stromer also described the giant crocodilian Stomatosuchus.
- Friedrich Wilhelm "Fritz" Strassmann: German chemist who, with Otto Hahn in early 1939, identified barium in the residue after bombarding uranium with neutrons, results which, when confirmed, demonstrated the previously unknown phenomenon of nuclear fission.
- Hubertus Strughold: German-born physiologist and prominent medical researcher. For his role in pioneering the study of the physical and psychological effects of human spaceflight he became known as "The Father of Space Medicine".
- Thomas C. Südhof: biochemist, discovered how molecule signals instruct vesicles to release their cargo in cell. Shared the Nobel prize in Physiology or Medicine 2013.

== T ==
- Ehrenfried Walther von Tschirnhaus: He is considered to have been the inventor of European porcelain.
- Oscar Troplowitz: He invented adhesive tape, Leukoplast.

== U ==
- Dietrich "Diedrich" Uhlhorn: Engineer, mechanic and inventor, who invented the first mechanical tachometer (1817), between 1817 and 1830 inventor of the Presse Monétaire (level coin press known as Uhlhorn Press) which bears his name.

== V ==
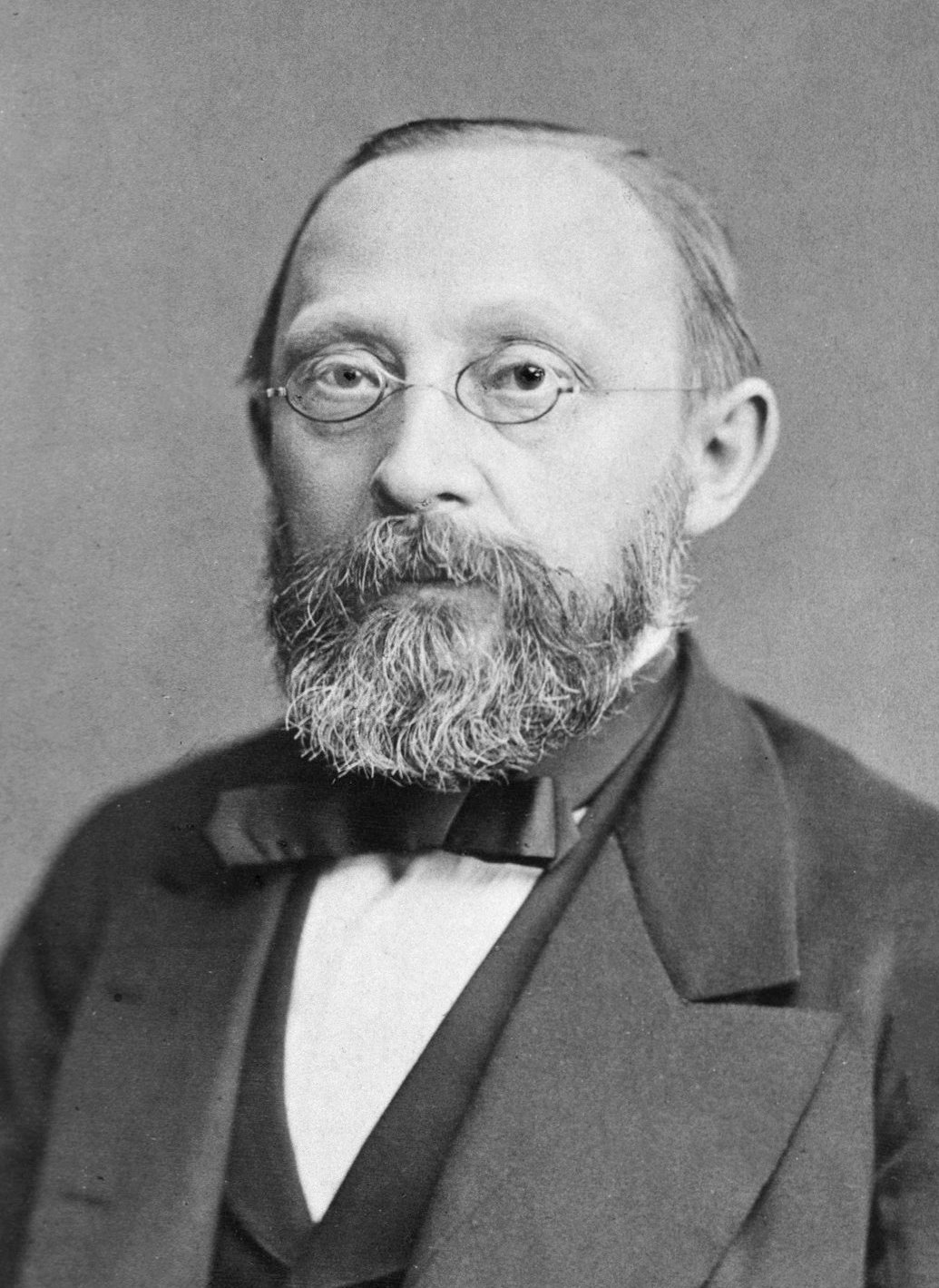
Rudolf Virchow

- Abraham Vater: Professor of anatomy; Ampulla of Vater.
- Richard Vetter: Developed the most fuel efficient condensing boiler for heating systems in 1980. Used in many houses in Europe.
- Rudolf Virchow: "Father of modern pathology"; numerous discoveries in the area of medicine.
- Hans Vogt: Invented sound-on-film (idea 1905) together with Jo Engl and Joseph Massolle, first sound-on-film for the public on 17 September 1922 in Filmtheater Alhambra, Berlin, Germany.
- Woldemar Voigt (often: Waldemar Voigt): Physicist, who taught at the Georg August University of Göttingen. He worked on crystal physics, thermodynamics and electro-optics. He discovered the Voigt effect in 1898.
- Woldemar Voigt (engineer): Chief designer at Messerschmitt's Oberammergau offices and pioneer of the Me 163 and Me 264, project leader of the development of Me P. 1101, Me P. 1106, Me P. 1110, Me P. 1111, Me P. 1112 and Me P. 1116.
- Jacob Volhard: Chemist who discovered, together with his student Hugo Erdmann, the Volhard–Erdmann cyclization.

== W ==
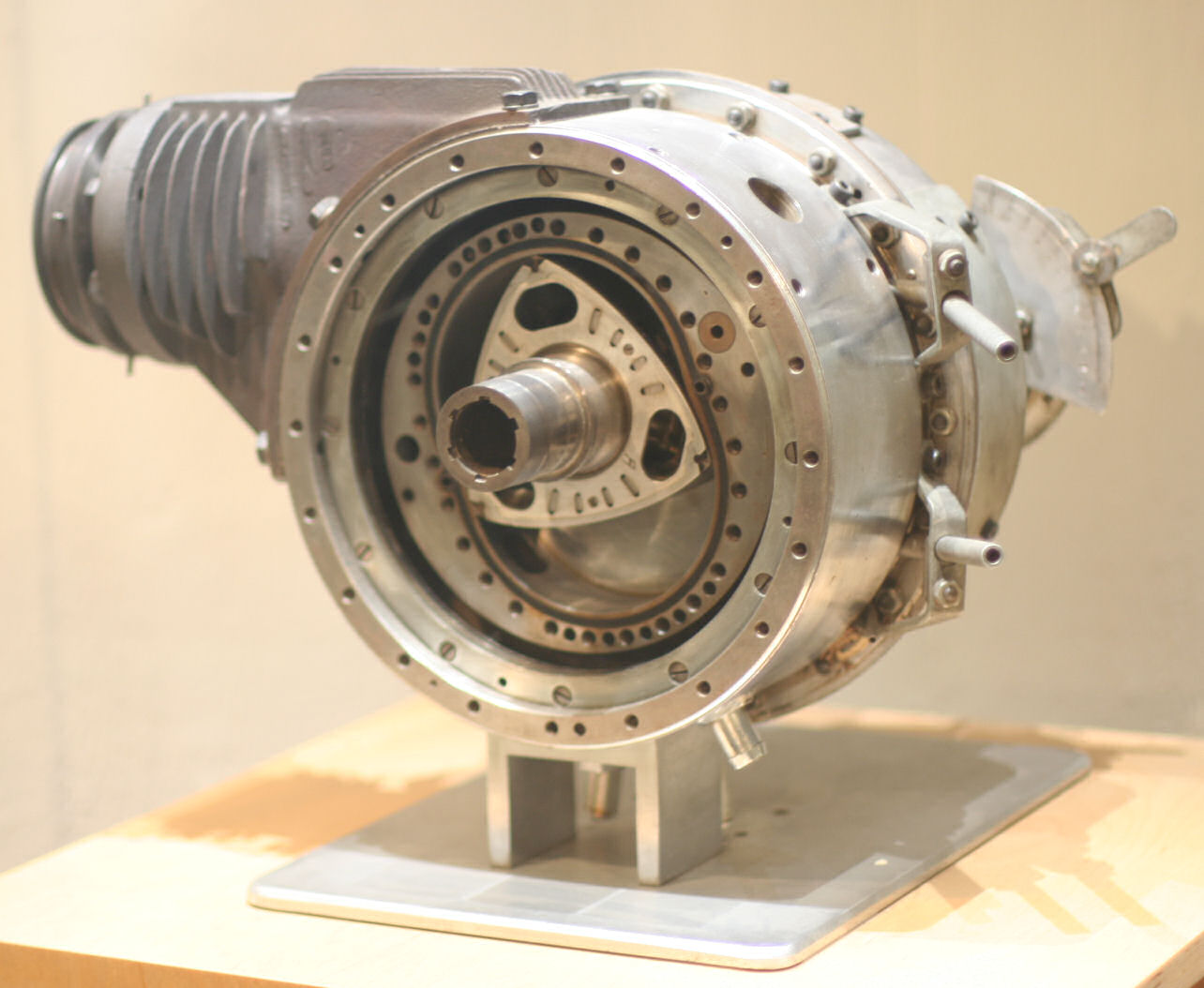
Wankel engine, type DKM54 (1957)

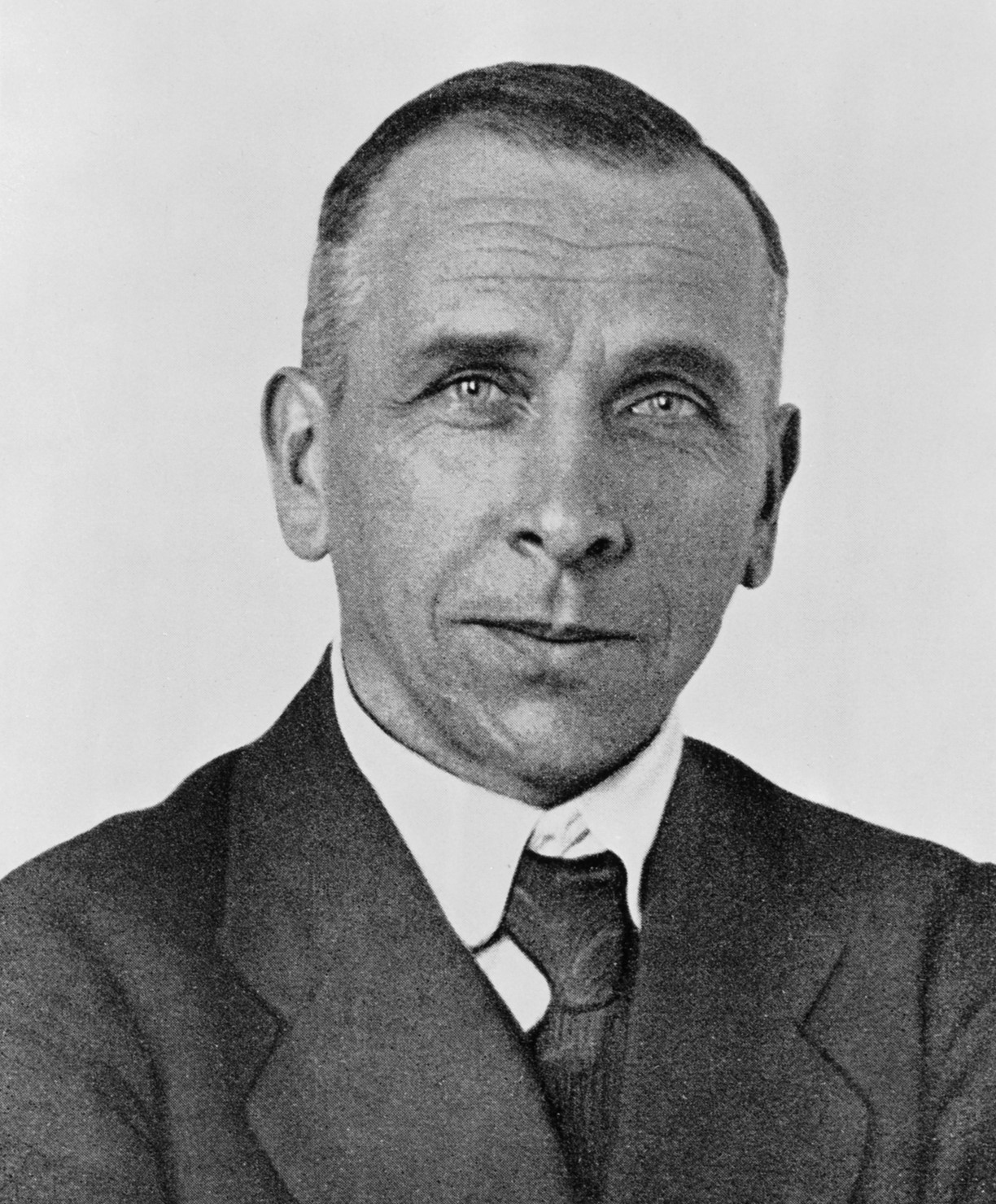
Alfred Wegener

- Martin Waldseemüller: Cartographer, used the name "America" on his map Universalis Cosmographia in honour of the Florentine explorer Amerigo Vespucci. The map was drawn at St-Die in 1507 and it was the first time "America" was used on a map.
- Otto Wallach: Chemist who researched, amongst others, alicyclic compounds. Nobel Prize in Chemistry 1910.
- Hellmuth Walter: Engineer who pioneered research into rocket engines and gas turbines.
- August von Wassermann: Developed a complement fixation test for the diagnosis of syphilis in 1906
- Felix Wankel: Inventor of the Rotary Motor.
- Max Weber: Discovered the mass effects of capitalism and modernity.
- Wilhelm Eduard Weber: Inventor of the first electromagnetic telegraph together with Carl Friedrich Gauss.
- Alfred Wegener: He is most notable for proposing continental drift in 1912
- Wilhelm Weinberg: Hardy–Weinberg principle
- Gustav Weißkopf: Aviation pioneer, designer and builder of early aircraft and engines, is reported to be the first flying a powered aircraft in 1901
- Rainer Weiss: born in Berlin, American physiscist who invented laser interferometric gravitational wave detectors. Shared the Nobel Prize for Physics 2017.
- Johan Wilcke: Inventor of the electrophorus
- Hugo Winckler: Discovery of Hattusa
- Clemens Alexander Winkler: Chemist who discovered the element germanium in 1886.
- August Wöhler: Investigated fatigue phenomena in the behavior of materials
- Friedrich Wöhler: The first to synthesize urea. Wöhler is regarded as a pioneer in organic chemistry.
- Heinrich Wöhlk: Contact lenses in PMMA
- Theodor Wulf: Cosmic ray (together with Austrian Victor Hess)

== Z ==
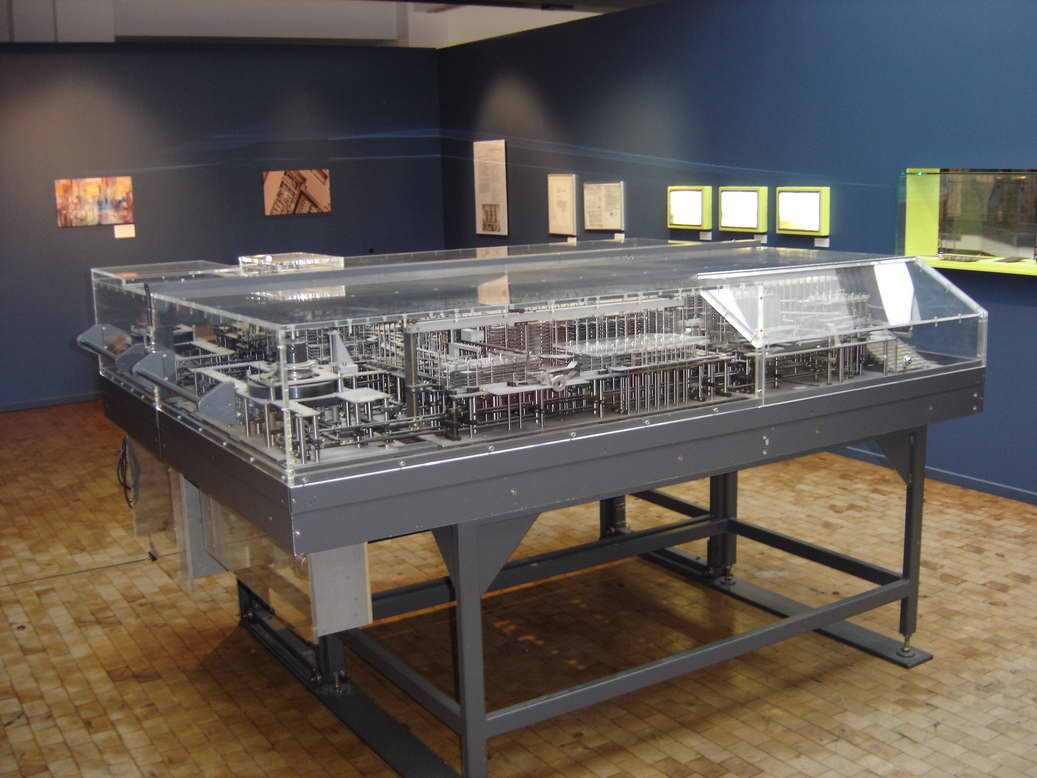
Konrad Zuse's Z1; replica in the German Museum of Technology in Berlin

- Hermann Zapf: Pioneer of computer typography and creator of many well-known typefaces.
- Carl Zeiss: Pioneered glass casting and allied procedures and processes for high quality optics.
- Ferdinand Graf von Zeppelin (1838–1917): Inventor of the airship named after him. Start of the airship LZ1 in 1900.
- Karl Zimmer: Discovered the effects of ionizing radiation on DNA in 1935.
- Karl Ziegler:He won the Nobel Prize in Chemistry in 1963, with Giulio Natta, for work on polymers.
- Konrad Zuse: Inventor of the first functional program-controlled Turing-complete computer in 1941, and the first high-level programming language Plankalkül in 1942.

== See also ==
- German inventions and discoveries
- List of German Americans
