= Woodchip =

Woodchip may refer to:

- Woodchips, a medium-sized solid material
  - Woodchipper, a machine
- Ingrain wallpaper, in home decoration
