= Müritz (disambiguation) =

Müritz is the largest inland lake within Germany.

Müritz [ˈmyʁɪts], from the Slavic word morcze for "small sea", may also refer to:

- Landkreis Müritz, a former county in Mecklenburg-Vorpommern, Germany
- Müritz National Park in the Mecklenburg Lake District, Germany
- Graal-Müritz a village in the county of Rostock in Mecklenburg-Vorpommern, Germany
- Klein Müritz, in the borough of Ribnitz-Damgarten in the county of Vorpommern-Rügen in Mecklenburg-Vorpommern, Germany

== See also ==
- Müritzsee, a lake south of the Müritz
