= Hugo Erdmann =

German chemist (1862–1910)

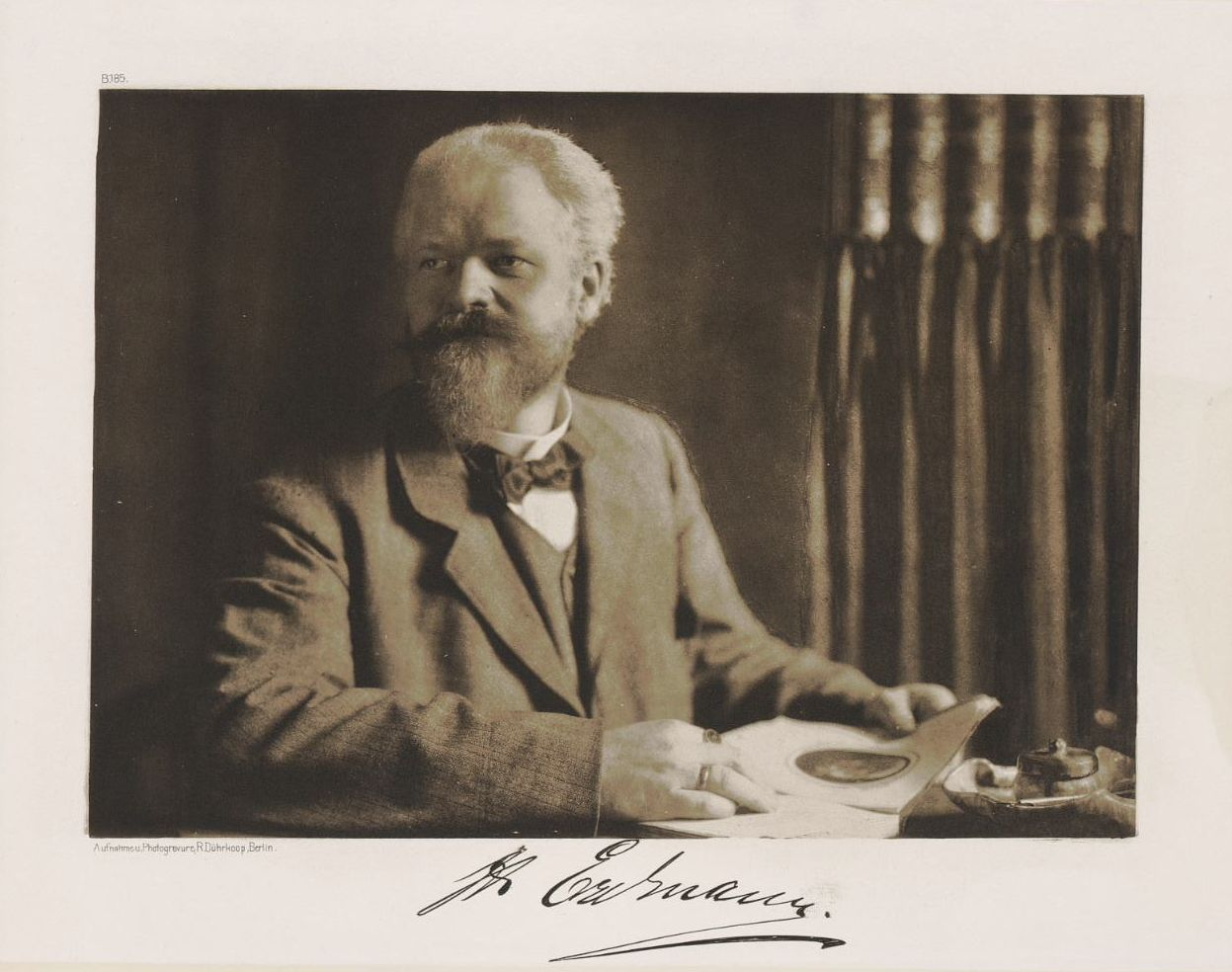
- Hugo Erdmann
- Born: 8 May 1862; Preußisch Holland, Kingdom of Prussia
- Died: 25 June 1910 (aged 48); Müritzsee, German Empire
- Known for: Volhard-Erdmann cyclization
- Scientific career
- Doctoral advisor: Jacob Volhard

Hugo Wilhelm Traugott Erdmann (8 May 1862 – 25 June 1910) was the German chemist who discovered, together with his doctoral advisor Jacob Volhard, the Volhard-Erdmann cyclization. He earned a Ph.D. degree in chemistry in 1883 from the University of Strasbourg. In 1898 he was the first who coined the term noble gas (the original noun is Edelgas in German).

Erdmann invented the name Thiozone in 1908, hypothesizing that S_{3} made up a large proportion of liquid sulfur.

In collaboration with Rudolph Fittig, Erdmann found that dehydration of γ-phenyl structural analog of isocrotonic acid produced α-naphthol, an observation that provided evidence in understanding the nature of naphthalene.

== Bibliography ==
Books written by Erdmann:

1. Hugo Erdmann (2009-01-31). Introduction to Chemical Preparations. BiblioLife. ISBN 978-0-559-91368-6.

== See also ==
- German inventors and discoverers
