= Jacob Volhard =

German chemist (1834–1910)

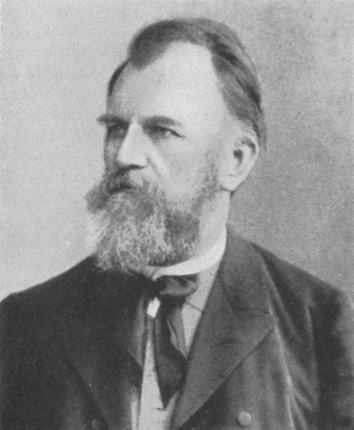
- Jacob Volhard
- Born: 4 June 1834; Darmstadt, Grand Duchy of Hesse and by Rhine
- Died: 14 January 1910 (aged 75); Halle/Saale, German Empire
- Known for: Volhard method Volhard–Erdmann cyclization, Hell–Volhard–Zelinsky halogenation.
- Scientific career
- Doctoral advisor: Justus Liebig, Heinrich Will
- Doctoral students: Hugo Erdmann, Johannes Thiele, Daniel Vorländer, Hermann Staudinger

Jacob Volhard (4 June 1834 – 14 January 1910) was the German chemist who discovered, together with his student Hugo Erdmann, the Volhard–Erdmann cyclization reaction. He was also responsible for the improvement of the Hell–Volhard–Zelinsky halogenation.

From 1852 to 1855 he studied chemistry at the University of Giessen, and afterwards, furthered his education at Heidelberg University. For two years he worked as an assistant under Justus von Liebig at the Ludwig-Maximilians-Universität München, and from 1860 to 1861 studied with August Wilhelm von Hofmann in London. In 1863, he obtained his habilitation at the Ludwig-Maximilians-Universität München, where he subsequently became an associate professor. In the meantime, he worked in the Institute of Plant Physiology at the Bavarian Academy of Sciences (1865–76). In 1879, he was named a professor of organic chemistry at the University of Erlangen, then in 1882 relocated to the University of Halle, where he served as a professor up until 1908.

== Selected works ==
- Die Begründung der Chemie durch Lavoisier, 1870 – The founding of chemistry by Antoine Lavoisier.
- Experiments in general chemistry and introduction to chemical analysis, 1889; Analytic tables by Clemens Zimmermann, translated by Edward Renouf.
- August Wilhelm von Hofmann : ein Lebensbild im Auftrage der Deutschen chemischen Gesellschaft, 1902 – Biography of August Wilhelm von Hofmann.
- Justus von Liebig (2 volumes, 1909) – Biography of Justus von Liebig.

== See also ==
- German inventors and discoverers
