= Adolf Rambold =

German inventor and engineer (1900–1996)

- Born: 5 October 1900; Stuttgart, Baden-Württemberg, Germany
- Died: 14 May 1996 (aged 95); Meerbusch, Rhein-Kreis Neuss, North Rhine-Westphalia, Germany
- Occupations: Inventor, engineer

Adolf Rambold (5 October 1900 – 14 May 1996) was a German inventor and engineer.

== Life ==
Rambold worked for the German company Teekanne since 1924. In 1929, he invented the tea bag packing machine called Pompadour. In 1949, being a co-owner of Teepack he invented a modern form of tea bag - bag with 2 chambers which remains the most popular type of the tea bag till now. In the same year he proposed a new tea bag packing machine Constanta which produced 160 bags per minute.

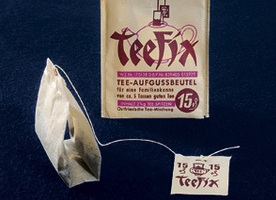
Teefix 2 chamber tea bag

== See also ==
- List of German inventors and discoverers
