= Volhard–Erdmann cyclization =

The Volhard–Erdmann cyclization is an organic synthesis of alkyl and aryl thiophenes by cyclization of disodium succinate or other 1,4-difunctional compounds (γ-oxo acids, 1,4-diketones, chloroacetyl-substituted esters) with phosphorus heptasulfide. The reaction is named after Jacob Volhard and Hugo Erdmann.

An example is the synthesis of 3-methylthiophene starting from itaconic acid:
