= Hugo Erfurt =

German pharmacist and inventor

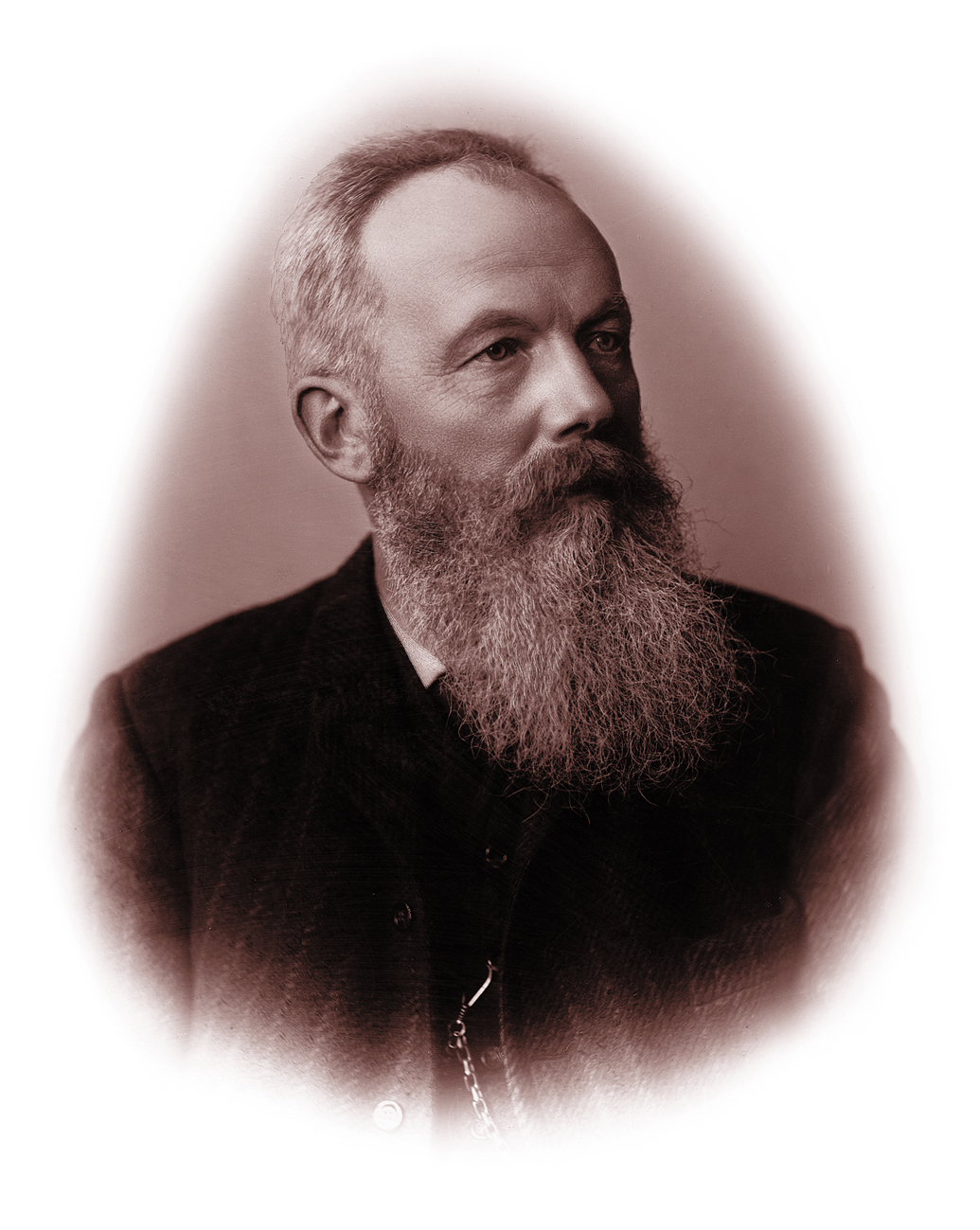
- Born: 13 February 1834
- Died: 4 March 1922 (aged 88)
- Occupations: Pharmacist, inventor

Hugo Erfurt (13 February 1834 in Schwelm – 4 March 1922 in Dahlhausen at Beyenburg) was a German pharmacist and inventor.

== Life ==
He invented ingrain wallpaper (woodchip) in 1864.

Erfurt was married.
