= Hans Luedtke =

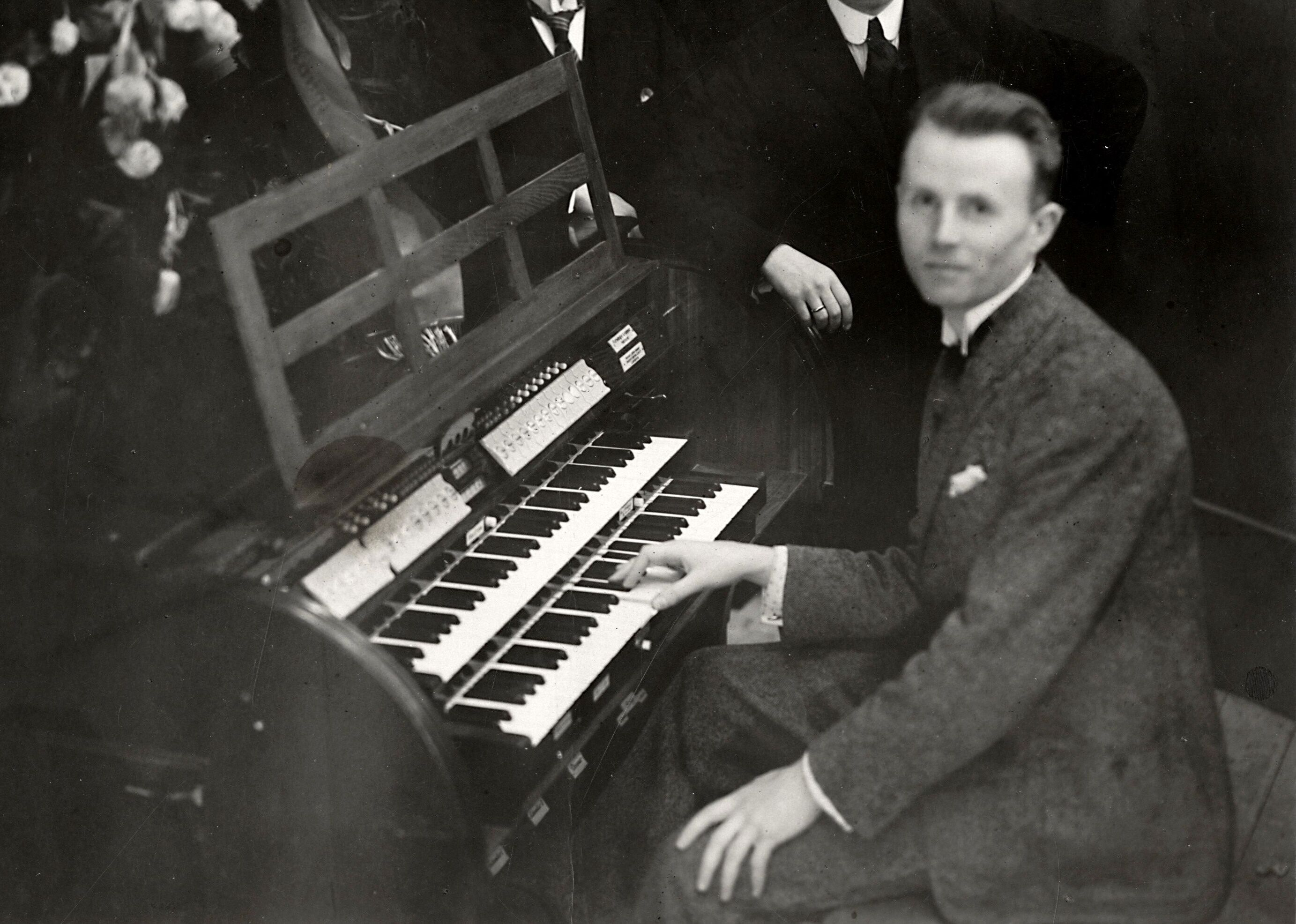
- Hans Luedtke in 1923
- Born: 1889
- Died: Unknown
- Occupation: Inventor

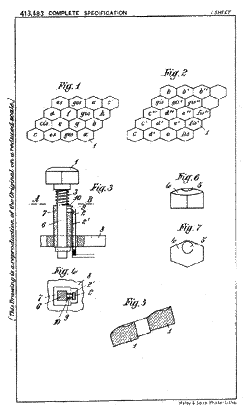
Patent drawing GB 413,483, accepted 19.07.1934

Hans Luedtke was a German inventor in the field of music.

== Biography ==
Organist, musicologist and inventor Hans Luedtke developed special Oskalyd extended organs and keyboards that could be used with any desired tone system. Rounded edge hexagonal shaped keys were to be arranged like honeycombs in such a way that intervals would be represented by unique vectors (i.e. a Generalized keyboard). He mentioned tunings with semi-, third-, and quartertones, methods for playing special glissandos, electronic switching between tunings or registers during performances, and he also outlined a notation system analogous to the keyboards and a direct opto-electric recording system.

== Patents ==
- DE 388,209. Walcker-Luedtke-Hammer Oskalyd Orgelbau. Vorrichtung zum Erhoehen der Klangwirkung von Tasteninstrumenten, Orgeln u. dgl. 1924.01.19
- DE 403,152. Walcker-Luedtke-Hammer Oskalyd Orgelbau. Tasteninstrument, Orgel o. dgl. (GB 218,252, CH 108,096, DK 34,686) 1924.10.09
- DE 630,202. H. Luedtke. Orgelartiges Musikinstrument. (US 1,919,849, GB 390,574) 1936.05.27
- DE 604,495. H. Luedtke. Tastatur fuer Zwecke der Klangausloesung, der Klangaufzeichnung und fuer Registrierzwecke, insbesondere bei orgelartigen Instrumenten. (US 2,003,894, GB 413,483, FR 756,638) 1934.10.23
- DE 630,202 H. Luedtke. Orgelartiges Musikinstrument. (US 1,919,849, GB 390,574) 1936.05.27
- DE 639,272 H. Luedtke. Ausbildung eines Tastenfeldes, insbesondere fuer Musikinstrumente. (US 2,061,364, GB 459,900)1936.12.02
- DE 749,198 P. H. Luedtke. Tastatur fuer Handharmoniken. 1944.11.17

=== Writing ===
- Viol-Chaconne (J. S. Bach) organ transcription, 1916
- "Seb. Bachs Choralvorspiele." (1918) BachJb xv, 1-96.
- "Zur Entstehung des Orgelbüchleins (1717)." (1919) BachJb xvi, 62-66
- "Das Oskalyd" (1926) Musik und Maschine 8-9, 385-387
- "Portativ-Positiv-Kleinorgel nach Changie-Prinzip" (1938) 'DIBZ' 39 p. 117 (ref. www.portativo.it - Studi e richerche sull'organo portativo)

== See also ==
- Prepared Piano
- Turkish music (style)
- Microtonal music

== Notes ==
1. Unusual sounds coming from Oskalyd op. 2113 installed in 1926 at Odessa, Ukraine: Große Trommel, Kleine Trommel, Gong, Tamburin, Holzblock, Retgen, große Kirchenglocke, kleine Kirchenglocke, brechendes Glas, Schlittenglöckchen, Turmuhr, Lokomotivenpfeife, Donner, Vogel 1, Vogel 2, Kuckuck, Telephon, Automobil, Jazz (ref. orgelforum post 8868)

== Bibliography ==
- An Elementary Treatise on Musical Intervals and Temperament. Robert Holford Macdowall Bosanquet. MacMillan & Co., London, 1876.
- "The Bosanquetian 7-rank keyboard after Poole and Brown." Erv Wilson. Xenharmonikôn Volume 1 (Spring 1974)
- "The Generalized Keyboard Scalatron." George Secor. Xenharmonikôn Volume 3 (Spring 1975)
- "History and Principles of Microtonal keyboard Design." Douglas Keislar. CCRMA Stanford Univ. Dept. Music, Rep. Nr. STAN-M-45. 04.1988
