= Ingrain wallpaper =

Wallpaper made from paper and wood fibres

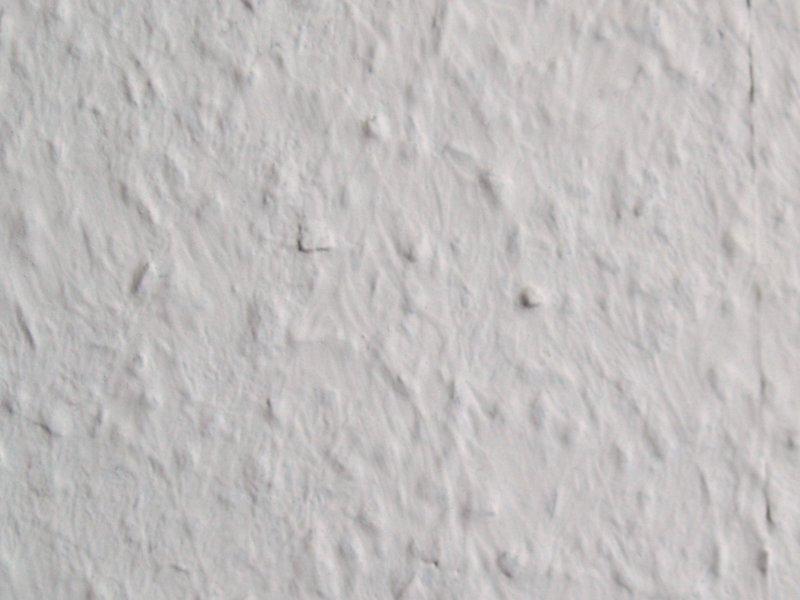
Structure of ingrain wallpaper

Ingrain (or wood-chip) wallpaper is a decorating material. It consists of two layers of paper with wood fibre in between; different kinds of ingrain wallpaper are distinguished by the size and form of the fibre pieces.

Ingrain wallpaper was invented by German pharmacist Hugo Erfurt in 1864; marketed by the company his grandfather founded, it was first used as a decoration for shop windows, but began seeing use as a wallpaper from the 1920s on as well.

Ingrain wallpaper is the most commonly used type of wallpaper in Germany. It was also commonplace in the United Kingdom and Ireland from the 1960s onwards, but has since fallen out of favour and become less common there, especially in new builds and more recent redecorations. At least since the 2000s, both popcorn ceilings and ingrain wallpapers have had a reputation for being undesirably old-fashioned, especially if encountered together, and also hard to remove. People flipping houses in recent decades in these countries routinely removed both. Unlike popcorn ceilings, ingrain wallpapers never made major inroads in most other parts of the English-speaking world, especially America. Ingrain wallpaper has however remained much more popular in Germany and her neighbouring continental European countries, where it is valued for its tendency to hide small dents and scuff marks, and hence is often retained and simply repainted during renovations. Ultimately ingrain wallpaper can become very difficult to remove once several coats of paint have been applied over the years, but whether that trade-off is widely accepted depends on the country and culture.
