= Müritzsee =

Lake in Germany

- Location within Mecklenburg-Vorpommern
- Location: Mecklenburgische Seenplatte, Mecklenburg-Vorpommern
- Coordinates: 53°16′30.06″N 12°39′47.22″E
- Primary inflows: Elde
- Basin countries: Germany
- Surface area: 112.6 km^{2} (43.5 sq mi)
- Surface elevation: 62.1 m (204 ft)

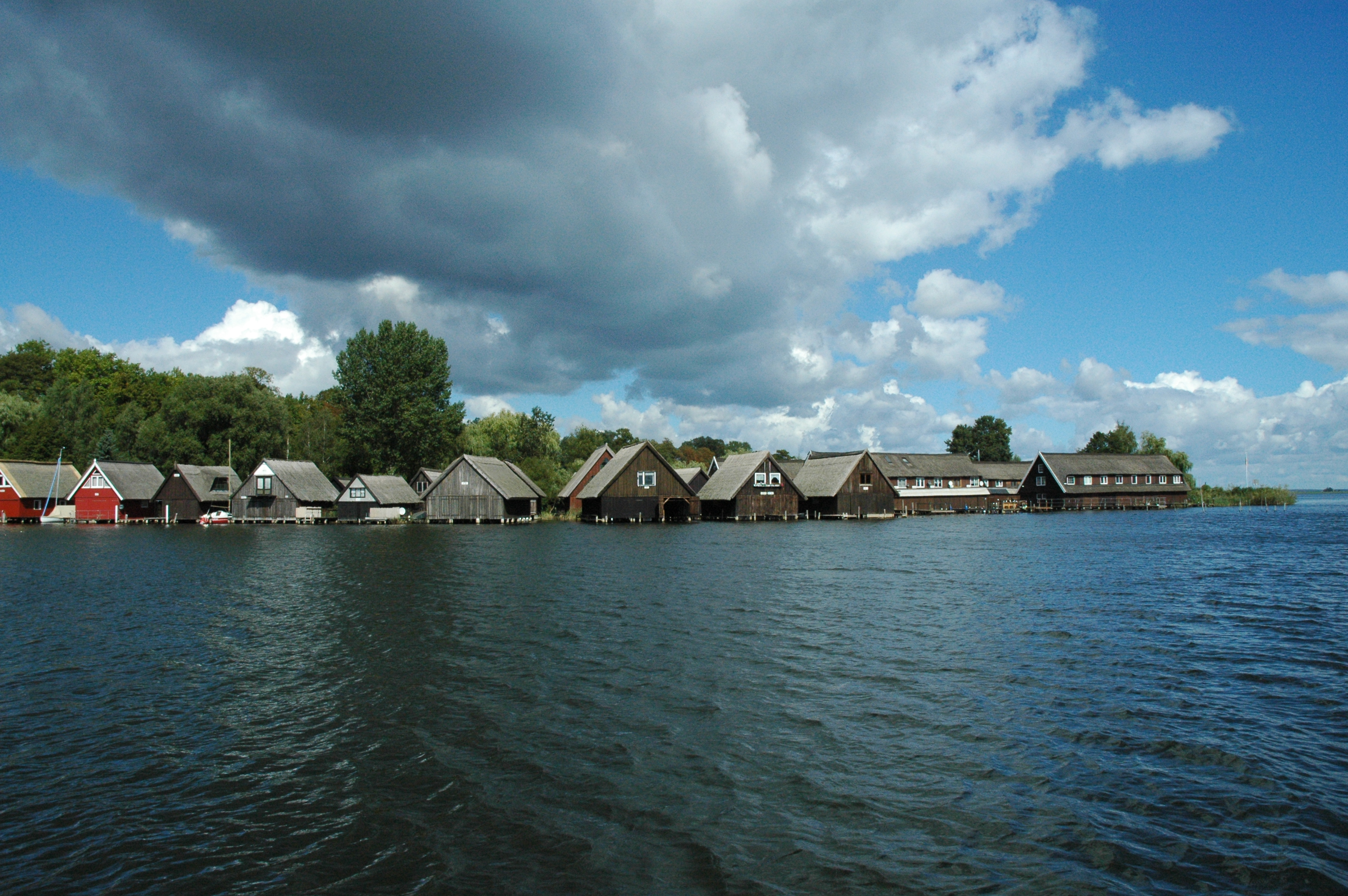

Müritzsee is a lake in the Mecklenburgische Seenplatte district of Mecklenburg-Vorpommern, Germany. At an elevation of 62.1 m, its surface area is 112.63 km².
