= Shirriff =

Canadian food manufacturer

Shirriff is the brand name of several food products first produced by the defunct Shirriff family food products company in Toronto, Ontario, Canada.

Francis Shirriff founded a food extracts company in the 1880s.

The company would go on to develop a line of food products including marmalades, dessert toppings and jelly and pudding mixes.

The company remained a family business until the 1950s when it was sold to the owner of the Dominion Stores chain. Later, the firm was bought by Kelloggs of Canada. In 1988 and 1992, Kelloggs sold its interests. Many of the Shirriff brand products are still in production, although now by other companies: The J. M. Smucker Company, Lipton Teas and Infusions, and Dr. Oetker. The company's most well-known product was likely its "Good Morning Marmalade", the best-selling marmalade in Canada.

Francis Shirriff was also one of the founders of the Niagara Falls Wine Company, later known as Bright's and Vincor International.

== History ==
Francis Adam Shirriff was born in Huntingdon, Quebec, the son of Scottish emigrant doctor Francis Walker Shirriff and Anna Macnider. He moved to Toronto in 1872 at the age of 24 and began working in the grocery business. In 1874, Shirriff started the Niagara Falls Wine Company with Thomas G. Bright.

In 1883, Shirriff founded his own business, the Imperial Extract Company, which sold essential oils and flavour extracts, beginning a long career in food production. The company exhibited at the Toronto Industrial Exhibition in 1885. Their exhibit was described by the Canadian Pharmaceutical Journal as "One of the handsomest exhibits" and "This firm have made a specialty of fruit and flavoring extracts, and are also giving considerable attention to perfumery, of both which they made a handsome display." The company's address in the 1886 city directory was 48 Colborne Street, listed for essential oils and perfumery. The company won a Bronze Medal for their display at the 1887 show and displayed a new product of lemon juice.

Bright and Shirriff moved to Niagara Falls to concentrate on the wine business, while the Imperial Extract Co. continued its operations in Toronto. In 1889, the company is listed at 49 Front Street East, sharing space with Bright, listed for essential oils, flavouring extracts, and baking powder. Shirriff's sons Colin, Francis, and William joined the business in the following decades. The company moved to 54 Colborne, sharing space with Bright and the Niagara Falls Wine Company.

In 1903, Shirriff first made marmalade. In 1905, it displayed its marmalades at a booth at the Pure Food Show at Massey Hall. The Toronto Daily Star reported: "One of the most daintily dressed booths in the hall is that of Shirriffs marmalades and flavoring essence. The public is invited to sample the delicious shredded orange marmalade served with reception wafers. Numbers of people took advantage of the invitation yesterday afternoon and expressions of approval were frequent. It is absolutely pure, containing nothing but the finest fruit and granulated sugar." The company also showed its jelly powders and flavouring extracts.

By 1909, the company was prosperous enough to build its own factory at 8–12 Matilda Street at Steiner (now Carroll) Street, just north of Queen Street East in Toronto. The building, designed by architect Charles Herbert Acton Bond of Bond & Smith was built at a cost of $20,000. The factory housed both the Shirriff production line and the Niagara Falls Wine Company. In 1911, the Shirriffs sold their share of the Niagara Falls Wine Company. Thomas Bright also sold out in 1933.

As a youth, naturalist Charles Sauriol, worked at the Shirriff factory after school and during the summers. Sauriol wrote about his experience:

At Shirriffs I learned several things about Seville oranges, also how jelly powders were made ... We ate a lot of jelly at home in those days. Each Friday the employees were given an opportunity to buy five pound damaged tins of marmalade for bargain prices under a dollar, and many the can I brought home. The Shirriffs were very kind to me and Will the senior partner would often stop to chat with me.

— Charles Sauriol in Toronto Archives, Charles Sauriol Fonds, Box 123286-4, Series 107, File 26

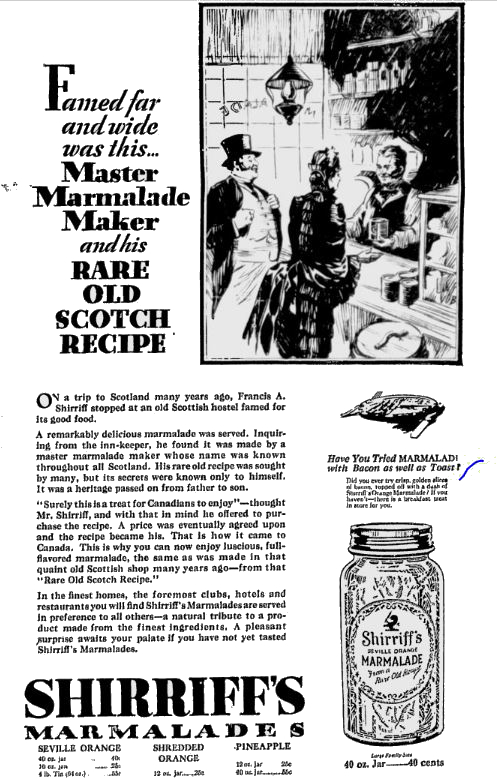
Advertisement depicting Shirriff finding source of recipe

In the 1920s, Shirriff advertised nationally in newspapers, describing their marmalades as something traditional, artisanal, and above all genuinely Scottish. An advertisement in the Ottawa Citizen of 1929 had the following text:

On a trip to Scotland many years ago, Francis A. Shirriff stopped at an old Scottish hostel famed for its good food. A remarkably delicious marmalade was served. Inquiring from the inn-keeper, he found it was made by a master marmalade maker whose name was known throughout all Scotland. His rare old recipe was sought by many, but its secrets were known only to himself. It was a heritage passed on from father to son. "Surely this is a treat for Canadians to enjoy" – thought Mr. Shirriff, and with that in mind he offered to purchase the recipe. A price was eventually agreed upon and the recipe became his. That is how it came to Canada. This is why you can now enjoy luscious, full flavoured marmalade, the same as was made in that quaint old Scottish shop many years ago – from that "Rare Old Scotch Recipe

— Ottawa Citizen

At the time, Shirriff sold three types of marmalade: Seville Orange, Shredded Orange, and Pineapple. Prices ranged from a 12 oz. jar for 25¢ to four-pounds for 55¢.

In 1927, Shirriff introduced the "Flavour Bud", a dissolvable capsule of extract for making jelly. Shirriff introduced the "Lushus" brand of products using the "Flavour Bud." In 1930, Shirriff introduced its "Good Morning" Marmalade, a recipe of three citrus fruits: oranges, grapefruit and lemons.

Francis Shirriff Sr. died in 1944 at the age of 97, and the company passed to his sons. In 1947, his grandson William David (David), son of William, joined the company. In his youth he had worked at the company, including working in the Shirriff booth at the Canadian National Exhibition. David fought in Italy during World War II and, in 1947, entered the family business in a managerial capacity.

By 1953, the company's 70th year, David Shirriff had risen in the business to take charge of the jam division. The Shirriffs decided to sell the company to J. William Horsey, president of the Dominion chain of supermarkets. "His father had died and his uncles were elderly and tired of the business demands so the time seemed right to sell." Horsey asked him to stay on and manage the new company, known as Shirriff-Horsey. In 1956, the company was estimated to have one-third of the marmalade, extracts and jelly powder market in Canada.

Shirriff-Horsey was merged with Salada Tea in June 1957. The merger created a large multinational food company. It was described as "an international food organization manufacturing and processing a variety of products in six cities in three countries," including a plant in Jamaica. In 1958, the company acquired the "Junket" dessert products company and its factory in Little Falls, New York. In 1962, the company name was changed to Salada Foods.

For several years, starting in the 1950s, Shirriff Salada gave away coins with depictions of National Hockey League hockey players on them in their food packages. At first, these coins were made of metal, but the company converted to plastic coins in the 1960s. These are bought and sold today as collector items. The company also introduced hockey cards and baseball player trading cards in their packages.

In 1965, David Shirriff left the company, thus bringing to an end the Shirriff family's 82-year association with the company. Horsey sold the company to cereal company Kellogg's of Canada in 1969. In 1988, Kellogg Salada sold the Shirriff ice cream toppings, jams and marmalades to the American J. M. Smucker Company. The American assets of Salada and Junket were sold to Redco Foods, Inc. and the Canadian assets to Unilever Ltd. In 1992, Kellogg sold the remaining Shirriff brands it owned (pie fillings and instant potatoes) to the Germany-based Dr. Oetker Ltd.

David Shirriff entered the plastics business after leaving Salada Foods. He also bought the Crown Inn, a 1200s-era inn in Chiddingfold, England. He sold the plastics business in 1992 and retired. He died in 2008 in the Veterans Section of Sunnybrook Hospital in Toronto. He was survived by Elizabeth, his wife of 60 years, their children Bill, Martha and Judy, his sister Kathryn and four grandchildren.

The Shirriff factory stood on Matilda Street until it was destroyed by fire in 2026. Shirriff's Good Morning Marmalade is produced by J. M. Smuckers in the United States and marketed as Shirriff's Pure Marmalade. Dr. Oetker continues to make Shirriff products at its factory in Mississauga, Ontario, Canada.

== Products ==
- baking powder
- essential oils
- flavour extracts
- ice cream toppings
- jelly powders
- marmalades
- mincemeat
- pie fillings
- pudding mixes
- potato chips
- instant mashed potatoes

== Notes ==
References

- Hood, Sarah B. (April 2012). "The Shirriff Saga: The story of a Toronto marmalade dynasty" (PDF). Culinary Chronicles: Newsletter of the Culinary Historians of Canada (70): 9–11.
