= Salada tea =

Canadian brand of tea

- Company type: Private
- Industry: Food and beverage
- Founded: 1892; 134 years ago
- Founder: Peter Charles Larkin
- Products: Tea
- Owner: Redco Foods, Inc. (U.S.); Lipton Teas and Infusions (Canada)

Salada tea is a Canadian brand of tea currently sold in Canada by Lipton Teas and Infusions and in the United States by Salada Foods, a division of Redco Foods, Inc. It was founded in 1892 in Toronto.

== History ==
The Salada tea business was founded in Toronto in 1892 by Montreal-born businessman Peter Charles Larkin. His main innovation was to replace tea sold loose from tea chests with a product packaged in foil. This helped establish a uniform flavor for Salada and the promise of consistent freshness to its drinkers. It became one of the leading teas in Canada and the northeastern United States.

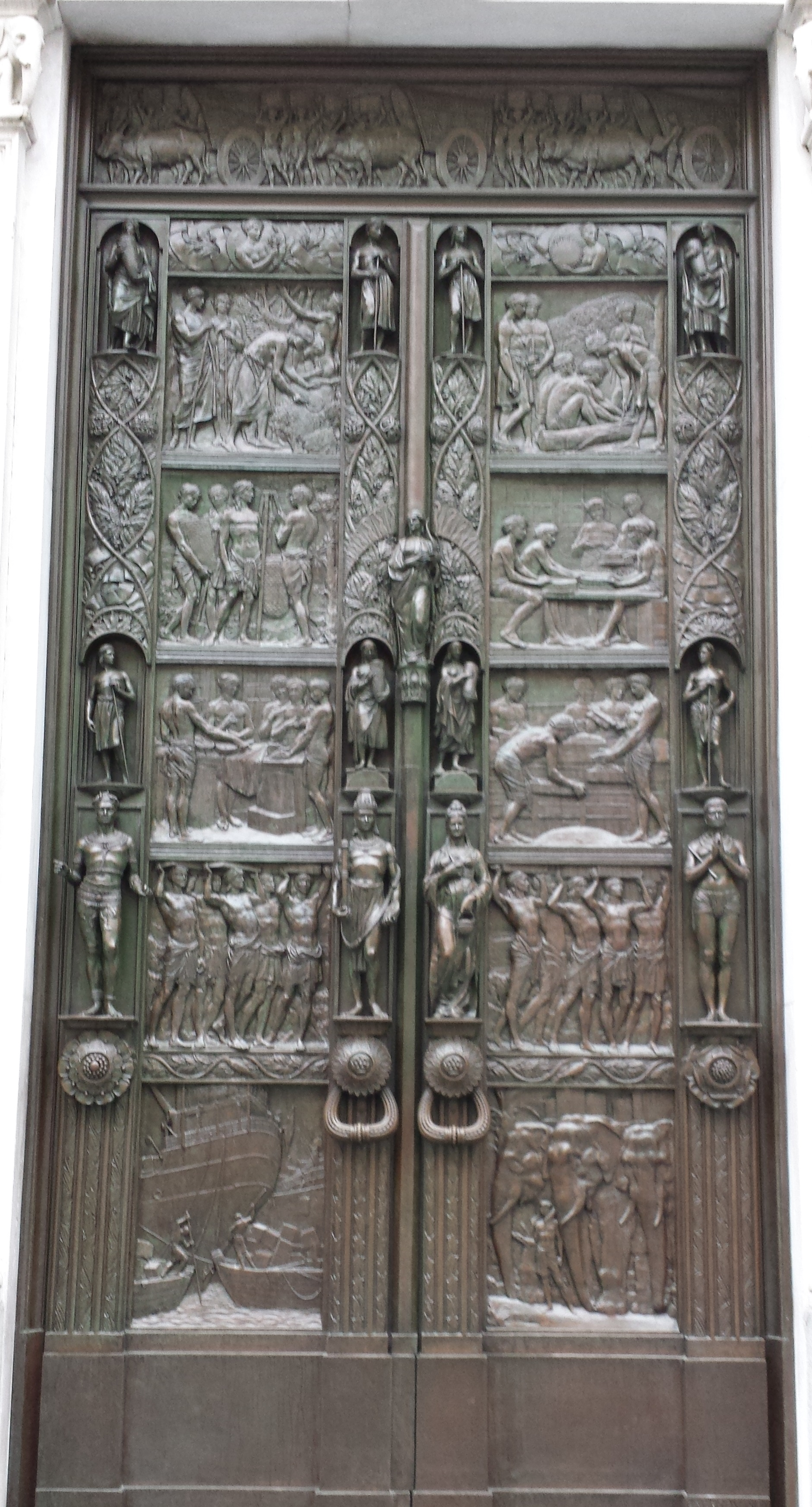
The Salada Tea Doors, designed by Henry Wilson, at the former Salada headquarters in Boston's Back Bay

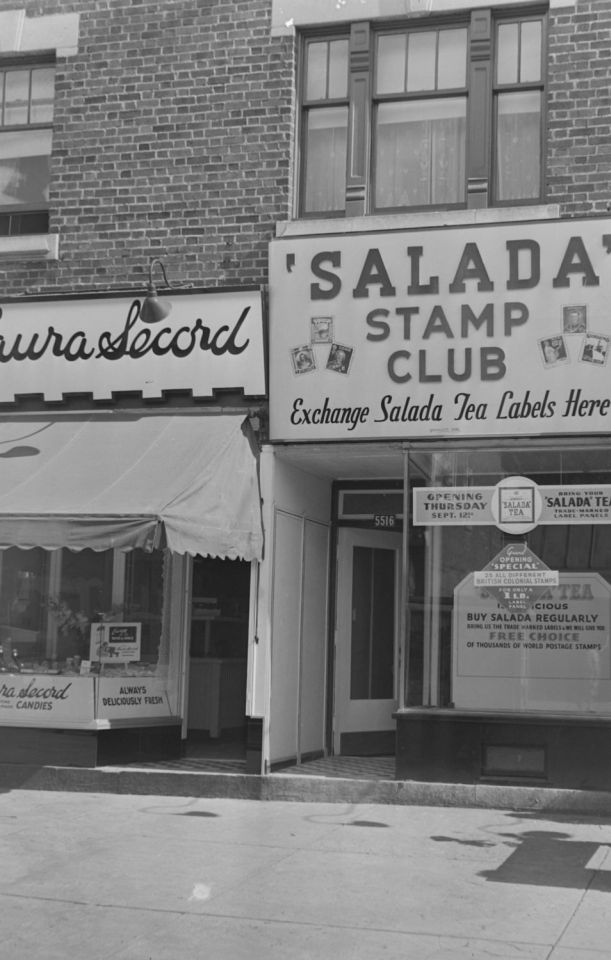
"Salada Stamp Club" in Montreal to exchange Salada Tea labels with postage stamps of the British colonies

By 1917, Salada tea was so popular in the United States that Larkin's company (the Salada Tea Company Limited) was able to establish a U.S. headquarters, blending and packaging plant at 330 Stuart Street in Boston, Massachusetts. Designed by architects Densmore and LeClear, the building featured large bronze doors by Henry Wilson inscribed with images of the history of the Ceylon tea trade, as well as Larkin's own contributions to a commitment to quality in the field. Although the building has changed hands several times, the doors are still there.

By the 1950s, Salada had established plants across North America. In 1957, the company was acquired by Shirriff-Horsey. From 1969 to 1988, it was owned in Canada by Kellogg Canada.

In 1988, Salada was acquired by Redco Foods, Inc., a company formed to produce Red Rose Tea in the U.S. under license from Unilever. Not long thereafter, Redco Foods sold Salada (Canada) to Unilever, so that each company produced both brands in their respective country. Since 1995, Redco Foods has been owned by Teekanne of Germany.

Since 2018, Salada-branded tea in the U.S. has been produced under license by Harris Tea Company. The Salada brand in the U.S. is still owned by Redco Foods,

Since 2022, Salada tea in Canada is a brand of Lipton Teas and Infusions, following Unilever divesting most of its tea business to CVC Capital Partners and with it the ownership of Salada brand in Canada.
