= Yamamotoyama =

Yamamotoyama may refer to:

- Yamamotoyama (tea company), a Japanese tea company
- Yamamotoyama Ryūta
