= John Manley Barnett =

American conductor

John Manley Barnett (3 September 1917 – 6 December 2013) was an American orchestral conductor and musician. He played cornet, trumpet, violin and piano. In 1939, he became the youngest professional symphony conductor in the United States. He toured the world extensively as an orchestral conductor and championed new performers and composers.

== Early life and musical education ==
Barnett was born in 1917 in Manhattan, New York, to optician Guy Carlton Barnett and Bernadette Emma (Manley) Barnett. He began studying music at the age of five, when his mother taught him how to play the piano.

In 1927, when Barnett was ten years old, his family relocated to Englewood, New Jersey. Haworth Grammar School teacher Clifford Demarest of Tenafly, New Jersey, noticed his talent and placed him on trumpet in the school orchestra, where he received musical ensemble training. Barnett continued studying with Demarest through grammar and high school, playing solos in Demarest's Tenafly High School Orchestra and the Beethoven Orchestra of Tenafly, which Demarest had founded. Barnett later conducted Demarest's arrangement "Bach Doric Toccata" (1939) in January 1940.

By 1930 Barnett had received awards for his trumpet and piano playing, winning two silver medals in the Junior Division at the New Jersey State Musical Contest at Newark. He was a freshman at Englewood High School (Dwight Morrow High School), studying with a member of the New York Philharmonic Orchestra who was preparing him to enter the orchestra when he reached the age of 21. Having played with the Heckscher Symphony Orchestra as cornetist, at the age of 13 he appeared as soloist in the 310th Infantry Band on August 12, 1931, at Winton J. White Stadium.

At the age of 15, he received a five-year scholarship for the period 1932–37 from the Philharmonic-Symphony Society of New York to learn orchestral conducting, advanced music theory, composition and piano. In 1932 he studied music at Columbia University summer school in New York City, with a four-week extension course in Boston, and entered Carnegie Hall's preparatory course to become a cornetist with the New York Philharmonic Orchestra. He had been studying the cornet since the age of ten with Moscow-and-Berlin-trained, New York Philharmonic cornetist/trumpeter Max Schlossberg (1873–1936), who was considered to be "the Founder of the American School of Trumpet Playing in the Twentieth Century". Barnett studied composition and counterpoint with Reginald Mills Silby of New York and Princeton, New Jersey. From 1930 to 1936, he studied violin with Hugo Kortschak, piano with Janet Daniels Schenck (founder of the Manhattan School of Music), and trumpet with Max Schlossberg at the Manhattan School of Music in New York City, where he obtained a Master's degree.

== Professional training ==
Barnett began his professional career in 1931, when he was accepted into the National Orchestral Association under conductor Léon Barzin, with whom he studied conducting for five years. In June 1936, accompanied by Barzin, Barnett sailed to Europe to study for a year in Paris, Romania, London and other European cities. Funded by a scholarship from the New York Philharmonic Society, the first of its kind, he studied with composer and conductor of the Orchestre de Paris, George Enescu, in Paris and at Enescu's estate in Romania. Barnett was the only conducting pupil that Enescu ever accepted.

Barnett studied at the Mozarteum Academy in Salzburg, Austria, with conductor Bruno Walter, Felix Weingartner and the Vienna Philharmonic. In Austria, he visited Linz and St. Florian, "the Bruckner cities", and attended the Bruckner Festival. He spent six months in Copenhagen and Prague, studying with Russian conductor Nikolai Malko, travelled with Malko through England, Denmark and Russia, and studied operatic conducting in Moscow, Leningrad and Kiev. Barnett spent a year studying conducting in Europe, returning to Paris in the summer of 1937 to resume his studies with Enescu, and returned to the United States later that year. a few months after his father died.

== Early career ==
In 1937, Barnett was appointed assistant conductor to Leon Barzin of the National Orchestral Association, and conducted for the New York Federal Civic Orchestra (part of the WPA Federal Music Project) twice a week in Brooklyn and New York.

In 1939, at the age of 21, he was appointed conductor of the Stamford Symphony Orchestra in Connecticut, retaining his other conducting posts. At the time he was known as the "youngest professional symphony conductor in the United States." One of his performances involved an appearance at the 1939 New York World's Fair, where he conducted the Federal Knickerbocker Orchestra of New York at the WPA Building on May 28, 1939, part of which was broadcast over WNYC.

Barnett was awarded the position of Principal Conductor of the New York City Symphony Orchestra in 1939 after guest conducting a semester-long Beethoven Cycle at Columbia University. He assisted conductors Thomas Beecham, Fritz Reiner and Otto Klemperer in the New York City Symphony's Carnegie Hall series, taking over two of Klemperer's Carnegie Hall concerts at short notice.

== The World War II years (1940s) ==
In 1941, Barnett was appointed conductor of the Brooklyn Symphony Orchestra, a newly-formed, all-professional organization sponsored by the Brooklyn Institute of Arts and Sciences, which made its debut on November 12, 1941. In 1942, he conducted the Naumburg Orchestral Concerts, in the Naumburg Bandshell, Central Park, in the summer series. Before the war he was conductor of the New York City, Brooklyn and Stamford (CT) Symphony Orchestras. Barnett joined the United States Army as a chief warrant officer from 1942 to 1946, enlisting at Yaphank, New York, on February 27, 1942, and during the war he organized bands in military camps in the United States and overseas. In January 1945 he conducted a War Bond Concert at the Civic Music Center in New York City, which was broadcast by WQXR Radio. In March 1946, after his discharge from the Army, he was given the Oliver Ditson Award by Columbia University, which allowed him to resume his music career, and he was chosen by the university to conduct at Winston Churchill's honorary degree conferral.

Barnett and his wife relocated to Southern California, where they settled and had three children in the following decade. From the fall of 1946 to 1948 he served as associate conductor to Alfred Wallenstein, conductor of the Los Angeles Philharmonic, and led the orchestra in nine appearances during the 1946–1947 and 1947–1948 seasons. He conducted the orchestra in two appearances on the coast-to-coast broadcasts of the "Symphonies for Youth" series.

During his years in California, Barnett served as associate conductor of the Los Angeles Philharmonic, music director of the Hollywood Bowl and of the Pacific Coast Music Festival, conductor of the Phoenix and San Diego Symphony Orchestras, and for over ten years he also conducted the NBC Network's "Standard Hour" broadcasts of the Los Angeles Philharmonic. The weekly live, one-hour broadcasts were sponsored by Standard Oil Company of California showcasing the talents of major orchestras on the West Coast, and broadcast wherever the company's products were sold.

After serving for two seasons with the Los Angeles Philharmonic, 30-year-old Barnett was appointed conductor of the newly formed Phoenix Symphony Orchestra. That position lasted only two seasons. He was dismissed by the Board of Directors on April 25, 1949, and returned to Los Angeles.

The Phoenix Symphony Orchestra, with Barnett as conductor, made its debut on November 10, 1947. Barnett commuted from Los Angeles, where he was associate conductor of the Los Angeles Philharmonic, bringing musicians with him as needed to supplement the fledgling orchestra. The season was successful and Barnett was re-engaged as conductor for the 1948–49 season. By April 1949, however, relations had soured between Barnett and the Board of Directors, and on April 25 the president of the board announced that they would engage a resident conductor who would also take on the responsibilities of a professorship at Arizona State College at Tempe, and that Barnett need not apply because "he would not get it."

Barnett's response was "I would never apply for a position I had already proved I could hold." He met with the orchestra and said that none of the complaints against him had anything to do with the music or the development of the orchestra, and his dismissal was "on purely social grounds, although the term used was 'poor public relations.'" He claimed his principal mistake had been not attending a Phoenix Symphony Association party the evening after the Concertmaster's performance, which had offended certain board members. He had explained that he was exhausted after performances and could not attend. He said he had previously suggested that parties be held the night before a performance, but the suggestions had gone unheeded.

The second reason he gave for his dismissal was his rejection of broadcasting symphony concerts for which the Symphony Association would not receive payment. The third reason was that he had complained about lack of dressing facilities for concerts at Arizona State College, and lack of hotel arrangements for musicians imported from out of the Tempe area. The final reason he gave was that he believed the Phoenix Symphony Association's Board of Directors was "antagonistic toward the musicians union." After terminating Barnett, its founding conductor, the Board of Directors had a hard time holding on to conductors and five came and went in the orchestra's turbulent first quarter-century of existence.

== Middle career ==
On February 20, 1956, Barnett was named the conductor of the Guild Opera Company of Los Angeles, a position he was to hold for twenty-five years.

Later in 1956, Barnett and the 92-member Los Angeles Philharmonic began a 60-concert nine-week goodwill tour the free Far East under the sponsorship of the State Department and the American National Theater and Academy. Uncommon during the time, it was the first major orchestra in the Western United States chosen for an international cultural exchange program with the Orient. The orchestra was given a VIP-sendoff by Jack Benny, Jane Powell, Arthur Rubinstein, and Gregor Piatigorsky, and the orchestra flew to the Philippines, Thailand, Singapore, Malaysia, Hong Kong, Taiwan, Okinawa, Korea, and finally back to Japan for an eleven-city tour. The orchestra's concerts would eventually be heard by over 250,000 people during the course of its tour. The orchestra's tour was the United States' response to Soviet propaganda being spread throughout Asia that the United States had no appreciation of culture and the fine arts, with the Los Angeles Philharmonic chosen to represent the refinement and good taste of American culture.

The tour included stops in Manila, Bangkok, Singapore, Kuala Lumpur, Hong Kong, Taipei, Okinawa, Seoul, and 11 cities in Japan (Tokyo, Yokohama, Shizuoka, Osaka, Hiroshima, Kokura, Fukuoka, Kyoto, Otsu, Sapporo and Nagoya). The orchestra premiered its first concert on April 30 in the sweltering mid-90-degree heat and high humidity of Manila, where a crowd of more than 3,000 people attended, 2,500 of them sitting in squeaky rattan-bamboo chairs provided at the Mapua Memorial Hall, usually used as a sports arena, with many more listening from outside the venue.

A touching photograph of a Filipino child listening to the orchestra from behind barbed wire was taken by Leigh Wiener, a Los Angeles Times staff photographer who was assigned to send back a pictorial account of the orchestra's nine-week tour.

While in Manila, on May 3, the orchestra took a junket to the small island fortress of Corregidor (three days before the 14th anniversary of its surrender to Japan by the U.S.). They visited the still-visible scars of war and the small cemeteries interring the American defenders of the island who perished there.

In Singapore, the orchestra was entertained with traditional Balinese and Malayan (now called Malaysian) music performed by their musical counterparts in a Gamelan orchestra complete with Balinese dancers. Because the violin was a popular "Western" instrument in Singapore, Barnett spent an entire morning at the Goh Soon Tioe School of Music working on Mozart's 26th Symphony with 20 Chinese, Indian and Eurasian children string players ranging in age from six to twenty-four.

In Formosa (now known as Taiwan), principal conductor Alfred Wallenstein and his wife were guests of the country's leader's wife, Mme. Chiang Kai-shek, who welcomed the orchestra wholeheartedly, seeing the tour as a way to win over the Southeast Asian people's hearts and minds in this tumultuous post-war era.

In Korea, the orchestra performed at Outpost Mazie for 5,000–6,000 soldiers of the U.S. 24th Regiment, which was stationed at the demilitarized zone on the 38th Parallel between free South Korea and communist North Korea. The soldiers built a makeshift orchestra shell within sight of artillery emplacements, and named the shell the "Alfred Wallenstein Bowl" after the orchestra's conductor.

On June 17, the orchestra arrived for the final leg of its tour in Japan before heading back to Los Angeles on June 23.

In Japan, the orchestra was quite busy, giving concerts in eleven cities. Conductor Wallenstein was thrilled with the sizes of the audiences for the Japan concerts, estimating attendance for each concert to be between 12,000 and 15,000 and commending them for their concert etiquette and rapt attention, wishing that U.S. audiences would emulate this behavior.

The orchestra was also able to visit the "atomic desert", the remains of the atomic bombing of Hiroshima.

Following the tour, the then 39-year-old Barnett was invited by the United States Information Service (USIC), the agency responsible for U.S. cultural programs abroad, to form and conduct the 96-piece bi-national Japan-America Philharmonic Orchestra in Tokyo. The Japan-America Philharmonic Orchestra included 60 professional Japanese musicians as well as 36 American musicians representing the 746th U.S. Air Force Band and the 56th U.S. Army Band. During his stay, Barnett guest conducted two major Japanese orchestras, the NHK Symphony Orchestra and the Tokyo Philharmonic Orchestra. He returned to the United States in August 1956.

Barnett returned to Japan in May 1957 with a two-fold purpose: conducting all of the nation's symphony orchestras, and taking the Japan-America Philharmonic Orchestra on a tour encompassing the larger part of the main island of Honshu and the lower island of Kyushu. He spent four months in Japan, returning to the United States in September 1957.

While in Japan, Barnett conducted all five Tokyo orchestras: MKH Orchestra of the Japanese Broadcasting Co.; the Tokyo Philharmonic; the Tokyo Symphony Orchestra; the ABC Symphony Orchestra; and the Nippon Philharmonic. In other parts of Japan, he also conducted the Kyoto Orchestra and the Kansai Symphony Orchestra.

The string instrument players of the Japan-America Philharmonic Orchestra consisted of Japanese string players from the ABC Symphony Orchestra of the Asahi Broadcasting Corporation. The woodwind and brass players of the orchestra were American military personnel, including members of the 746th AAF Band, the 56th Army Band, the 1st Cavalry Band, and 8th Army Band members from Korea. The orchestra's tour was co-sponsored by the United States Information Service of the American Embassy in Tokyo, and the Japanese Cultural Organization. Transportation was provided free of charge by the United States Air Force.

The orchestra performed eleven adult and three children's concerts in a span of fifteen days. One of the purposes of touring Japan was to foster good relations with the country, which was also being courted by the Soviets during the height of the Cold War. Barnett said in a Los Angeles Times article dated September 22, 1957, that the goal of the orchestra (and the American Embassy) was to put on higher-quality concerts for the average Japanese for the same low price the "leftists" were providing, and also to show camaraderie between Japanese and American musicians working together to overcome any lingering resentment still existing after the war.

== The National Orchestral Association years (1958–1970) ==
After 12 years as associate conductor of the Los Angeles Philharmonic, Barnett resigned to accept a position as music director of the National Orchestral Association in New York City. Barnett conducted his final two sold-out performances with the Los Angeles Philharmonic on April 16, 1958, at the California Theater in San Bernardino, a city which he had visited frequently during his years in Los Angeles, as he was a member of San Bernardino County's Valley College Community Education, where he directed the San Bernardino Symphony Orchestra until 1958.

Barnett's earlier association with conductor Leon Barzin served him well. Acting as musical director of the National Orchestral Association from 1930 to 1958, Barzin was looking to retire. National Orchestral Association alumnus John Barnett was an obvious choice as his replacement.

Barnett was intimately familiar with the workings of the National Orchestral Association. He had played as a youth in the association's trumpet section and had benefited from its conductor-training program when he went abroad in 1936 to study conducting with some of the world's most famous conductors. Paul Affelder described the National Orchestral Association in his original liner notes circa 1968 from the Composers Recordings Inc. (CRI) LP of "Music of Wallingford Riegger" (conducted by John Barnett in 1967). Affelder stressed that the National Orchestral Association, in addition to being "a training school for young musicians," provided a bridge between music students graduating from conservatories and music schools and preparing to enter the real world of professional orchestral performance. Members went through grueling rehearsals with a professional conductor, were coached by distinguished professional symphonic players, and gave regular concerts at Carnegie Hall in New York City. Their repertoire was vast as well, requiring the students to learn about 100 standard pieces of the symphonic repertoire each season, in addition to unknown and newly composed works. This enhanced the ability of the student musicians to quickly read, learn and perform complex works on sight. They were also given the opportunity to accompany great guest soloists from time to time. In a way, it was a "feeder" orchestra for the major symphony orchestras of the time, similar to minor league baseball teams serving as "feeder" teams for the major league teams. It was from this "training orchestra" that many professional conductors chose musicians for their orchestras, many of them going on to hold principal positions in major orchestras around the world.

While musical director of the National Orchestral Association, Barnett championed new performers and composers, which resulted in many accolades for his work. In December 1967, John Barnett conducted an orchestra composed of prestigious alumni of the National Orchestral Association and the American Brass Quintet performing three recent works by contemporary composer Wallingford Riegger: Music for Brass Choir (1949), Recorded in the Grand Ballroom of the Manhattan Center, New York City, December 11, 1967; Movement for Two Trumpets, Trombone and Piano (1960), Recorded at Fine Sound, Inc., New York City, December 13, 1967; and Nonet for Brass (1951), Recorded at Fine Sound Inc., New York City, December 12, 1967. These works can be heard on the album "Modern Music for Brass" (Composers Recordings Inc. CD 572). He also encouraged the growth of new young artists by offering solo performance opportunities through the association's annual Carnegie Hall Concerts, and accompanied violinist Itzhak Perlman in his Carnegie Hall debut.

In addition to his work with the association, Mr. Barnett served as music director of the Philharmonic Symphony of Westchester (New York) and continued to direct the Guild Opera Company of Los Angeles. While with the Guild Opera, he worked with German stage director Dr. Carl Ebert in many productions, including Rossini's opera La Cenerentola (Cinderella) in which he introduced to the world a young USC student/star-in-the-making Marilyn Horne in her debut role as Cinderella.

== Late career (1970–2013) ==
In 1972 he became an artistic consultant for the National Endowment for the Arts (NEA), a position he would hold for eight years.

From 1979 to 1985, Barnett served as music director of the Puerto Rico Symphony. During this time he also guest conducted at the Casals Festival and the Pro Arte Musical concerts in San Juan. While in Puerto Rico, he was quite active in opera, conducting stage productions featuring such great operatic artists as Renata Scotto, Plácido Domingo, Alfredo Kraus, Kiri Te Kanawa, and Birgit Nilsson. In symphonic-soloist concerts, he conducted the orchestra for famed soloists Claudio Arrau (Piano) Paul Badura-Skoda (piano), Rudolf Firkusny (piano), Ruggiero Ricci (violin), Yehudi Menuhin (violin), Hermann Baumann (French horn), James Galway (flute), Shlomo Mintz (violin), Itzhak Perlman (violin) and Ravi Shankar (Sitar).

Barnett was constantly on the go traveling to his conducting appearances. He guest-conducted the San Francisco Symphony, the Honolulu Symphony, the Kansas City Symphony, the Fort Lauderdale Symphony, the Phoenix Symphony (of which he was the Founding Conductor), and the Eastern Music Festival. His conducting assignments took him all over the world, to such countries as Italy, Venezuela, New Zealand, Japan and throughout Asia. He also recorded for the record labels Capitol, Vanguard and CRI Records.

In keeping with the National Orchestral Association's teaching philosophy which influenced him greatly, Barnett's later years were dedicated towards nurturing promising musicians in higher education. He taught conducting and conducted student orchestral and operatic performances at Stanford University, Claremont Colleges's Summer Session, the College-Conservatory of the University of Cincinnati and at the University of Southern California in Los Angeles, where he had been a faculty member since 1947. As the head of U.S.C.'s Symphony Conducting Department, he taught and conducted well into his eighties.

== Private life and death ==
During World War II, on Easter Sunday, April 9, 1944, Barnett married South Carolinian Ruth Allen Gilland in the Army Chapel at Fort Rucker in Alabama

He married his second wife, professional dancer Marlyn Ann Balling ("Talma") in 1972 in Santa Barbara, California. They lived together in Westwood Hills, California, in the Hollywood Hills until his death.

Barnett died in Los Angeles, California, on December 6, 2013, at the age of 96.
