= Wentworth Wooden Puzzles =

Jigsaw puzzles manufactures in the UK

Wentworth Wooden Jigsaw Co.
- Company type: Private
- Founded: Pinkney, Wiltshire, UK (1994)
- Founder: Kevin Wentworth Preston
- Area served: Worldwide
- Products: Wooden Jigsaw Puzzles
- Website: www.wentworthpuzzles.com

The Wentworth Wooden Jigsaw Company (also known as Wentworth Wooden Puzzles) is a British maker of jigsaw puzzles with whimsically shaped pieces reflecting the theme of the image portrayed on the puzzle. It was founded in 1991 by Kevin Wentworth Preston and is based in the village of Pinkney near Malmesbury, Wiltshire, an area of England known as the Cotswolds. They relocated to South Marston, Swindon in May 2025.

== Company history ==
The venture was established on a dairy farm which was forced to diversify into other sources of income when milk production became uneconomical to sustain. Some of the old buildings were converted into industrial use, and the farm became an industrial estate housing many other traders, as well as the new puzzle enterprise.

=== Technology ===
Traditionally jigsaws are manufactured using a thin flexible cutting blade driven by a motor known as a bandsaw. This method of cutting thin wood requires a degree of manual dexterity and patience to avoid spoiling the work. An alternative solution to this labour-intensive method of cutting intricate shapes in wood was required using modern technology solutions. The advent of the commercial medium-power Laser device has enabled many industries to use this tool to cut many different types of material speedily. The puzzle-manufacturing process uses a laser-cutting method invented and perfected by the founder, Kevin Wentworth Preston, in 1994.

Wentworth production can now focus on the quality of manufacture and design innovation that this new tooling provides. The high-speed production technique allows the small company to supply in excess of 250,000 puzzles a year to destinations in over 35 countries throughout the world.

The design team produces each cutout style individually, most of the designs are unique "whimsy" jigsaw shapes. Whimsies are specially shaped pieces cut into puzzles "on a whim" by Victorian-era hand cutters, an era when jigsaw puzzles became a popular pastime. Wentworth retained this older style of manufacture, and is one of the remaining companies still producing puzzles using these Victorian techniques.

== 'Whimsy pieces' ==
The 'Whimsy' laser-cut wooden puzzles feature unique, individual, "whimsical" cut-out shapes that reflect the theme of the image used on the face of the puzzle. All puzzles are supplied in a cotton draw-string bag within a lidded box. These wooden puzzles are cut from 3mm thick wooden boards (as opposed to softer cardboard) to ensure they will survive the rigours of use for a very long time. Puzzles are supplied to the customer with the option of an image of the puzzle's subject matter printed on the box. With no reference image there is the added difficulty of assembling the pieces into the correct pattern, and the element of surprise concerning the subject matter when the puzzle's image is reassembled.

- Manufacture: 3mm wooden board derived from sustainable managed forests.
- Features: rarely include corner pieces or two pieces of the same shape.
- 'whimsical' shapes: which reflect the theme of the image in all standard puzzles.
- Packaging: a cloth bag inside a sturdy box made from recycled material.

== Styles ==
=== Traditional puzzles ===
All traditional puzzles include the unique whimsy pieces. Common sizes included are 100, 250, 500, 1,000 and 1,500 pieces.

=== Personalised puzzles ===
The ability to use a photograph or image design is a feature that Wentworth's puzzles make available in all the various sizes. Text may be added at the image creation process to include such messages as 'Happy Birthday' and 'Happy Anniversary' etc.

=== Difficult puzzles ===
The Tessellation puzzles range use jigsaw pieces in which the pieces are almost all identical in pattern. Some utilise pieces shaped like animals, such as deer. Other subjects include repetitive plant shapes such as ivy and holly cuts.

=== Children's puzzles ===
Puzzles shapes and styles are designed to suit all ages and ability, including images specially suited for children, which are traditionally constructed with larger, more manageable pieces with simpler pattern and shape design. The company was awarded recognition for its production in this section of the market in 2008.

In 2021, during mental health awareness week, Wentworth Wooden Puzzles released a series of mini jigsaw puzzles to promote the mindfulness and wellbeing that jigsaw puzzles can provide. Money from the sale of puzzles during that week were donated to Mind, a mental health charity.

=== Mini Mindful puzzles ===
May 6, 2021, Wentworth Wooden Puzzles released a series of mini jigsaw puzzles to promote the mindfulness and wellbeing that jigsaw puzzles can provide while also supporting mental health awareness week, Money from the sale of puzzles during that week were donated to Mind, a UK mental health charity.

=== Impact of COVID-19 ===
In March 2020 as people moved indoors due to COVID-19 restrictions, the Wiltshire factory saw an increase of nearly 400% in the amount of orders they received since the start of the pandemic and struggled to keep up with the demand.

In an effort to show gratitude to all those fighting the COVID-19 virus, the company launched a special "say thank you with a rainbow" puzzle. In March 2021 the company announced they had raised nearly £12,000 which was donated to a local coronavirus charity.
