= Junket =

Junket may refer to:

- Junket (dessert), milk-based dessert
- Junket (company), brand of rennet tablets and dessert mixes
- A business tourism trip where entertainment or leisure activities are a significant component.

== See also ==
- Press junket, used in film promotion
