= Stash Tea Company =

American specialty tea company

- Type: Private; (subsidiary of Yamamotoyama)
- Industry: Tea & Herbal tea
- Founded: 1972; 54 years ago in Portland, Oregon
- Headquarters: Tigard, Oregon, USA; 45.4004°N 122.7497°W
- Products: Loose-Leaf Tea; Bagged Tea; Teaware & related products
- Website: Official website

Stash Tea Company is an American specialty tea and herbal tea company officially based in Portland, Oregon. Founded in 1972 by Steve Lee, Dave Leger, and Steven Smith, the company is still originally headquartered in Tigard, a suburb of Portland. Since 1993, it has been a wholly owned subsidiary of Yamamotoyama of America, the U.S. division of the Japanese tea retailer Yamamotoyama.

Stash Tea produces and distributes bagged and loose-leaf teas through food service, retail, wholesale, and online channels in more than two dozen countries. The company is a Certified B Corporation.

== History ==
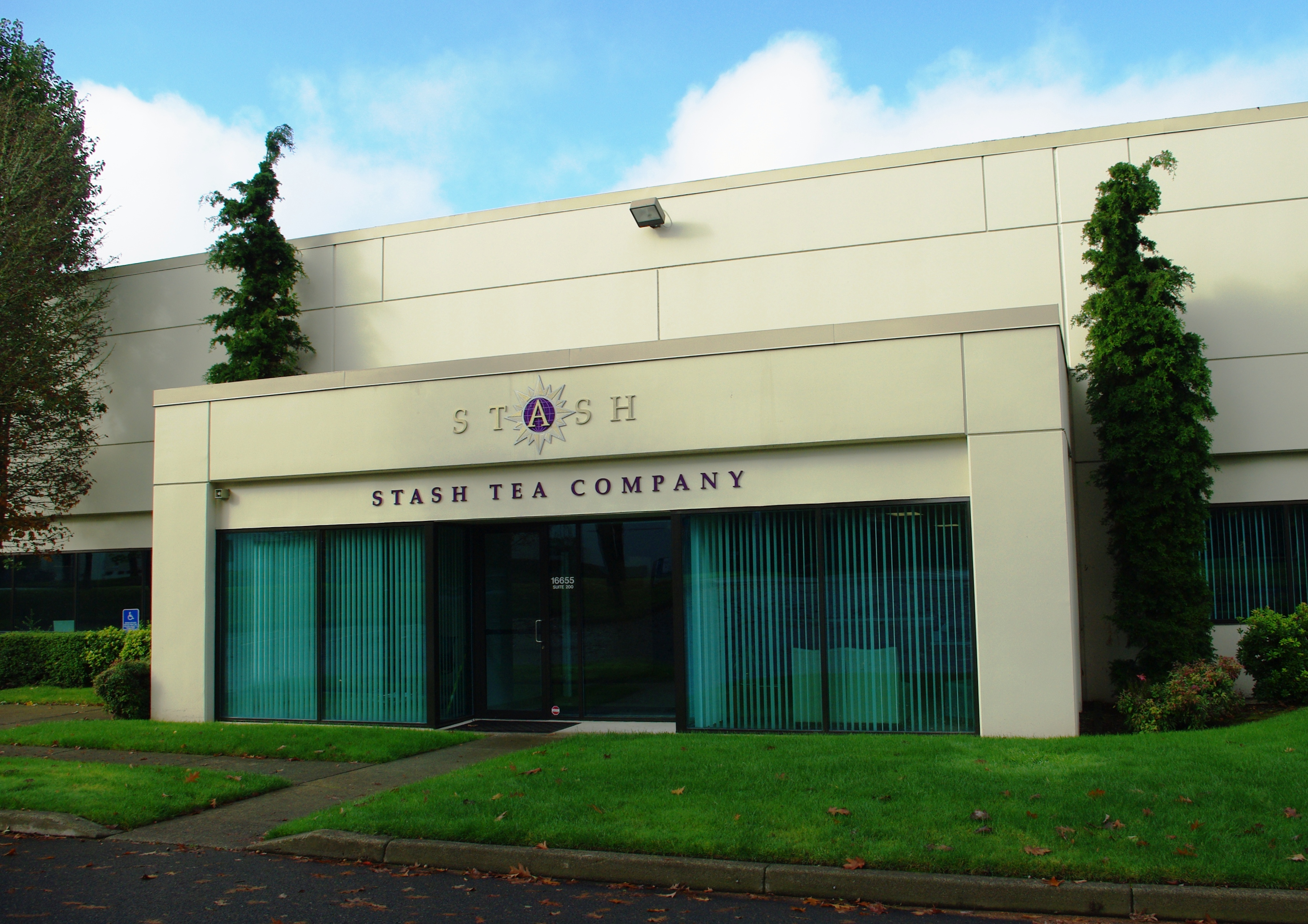
Current physical company headquarters in Tigard, Oregon

Legacy logo

Stash Tea was founded by Steve Lee, Dave Leger, and Steven Smith (who later founded Tazo and co-founded Steven Smith Teamaker) in 1972. The three founders started the business with $7,000 in capital, operating from the basement of a Victorian-era house in Portland, where they sold bulk herbs, spices, and loose teas to natural food stores. Back at the time, Smith persuaded growers in Prineville and Madras to harvest local peppermint according to his specifications, which he then personally delivered to be processed into the tea blends. In 1975, Stash expanded into bagged teas and launched a mail-order catalog, becoming one of the first companies to sell bagged herbal teas in the United States. The company also began supplying restaurants and other food service providers, which at one point represented 80 percent of total sales.

According to the company, Stash Tea derives its name from a tradition in which the captain of a tea-carrying clipper ship was given a small personal reserve, or "stash", of high-quality tea.

Stash Tea's relationship with Yamamotoyama began in 1977, when the Japanese company became its West Coast tea packager. Yamamotoyama acquired a 25-percent stake in Stash in 1979, gradually increasing its holdings over the following decade. Following a contested acquisition process, Yamamotoyama purchased the remaining shares in the summer of 1993, making Stash a wholly owned subsidiary of Yamamotoyama of America.

In 2005, Stash Tea opened a retail store in the Bridgeport Village shopping complex in Tigard, Oregon. The store closed in 2022 as the company lease had expired.

In July 2022, the company announced that it would relocate its headquarters from Tigard to downtown Portland, occupying a 7,000-square-foot (650 m^{2}) space at the corner of Southwest Yamhill Street and Ninth Avenue, near Director Park. The new location was planned to include corporate offices and a retail store with a tea bar. However, as of May 2026, no new location has been opened and no information has been released regarding alternative plans.

== B Corp certification ==
In September 2017, Stash Tea became a Certified B Corporation, meeting standards for social and environmental performance, public transparency, and legal accountability set by the non-profit organization B Lab. The following year, the company redesigned its packaging and obtained Non-GMO Project Verification for all tea bag blends.

== International operation ==
Stash Tea products are sold in more than two dozen countries. The company has worked with the U.S. Commercial Service to expand into international markets, including Brazil, Denmark, Sweden, Norway, Germany, and Central America countries.

== See also ==
- Tazo
- Yamamotoyama (company)
- Steven Smith (teamaker)
