= Zhuhai Zhongfu =

Zhuhai Zhongfu Enterprise Co., Ltd
- Company type: Public company
- Industry: Manufacturing
- Founded: 1982
- Headquarters: Zhuhai, China
- Products: Bottles and paper products
- Owner: CVC Capital Partners
- Website: http://www.zhongfu.com.cn/

Zhuhai Zhongfu (珠海中富) Enterprise Co., Ltd. engages in the production and supply of PET bottles in China. It offers PET bottles for soft drinks, mineral water, distilled water, tea, and beer. The company's products also include bottle labels, film, and packing paper boxes. Zhuhai Zhongfu Enterprise Co., Ltd. is based in Zhuhai city, Guangdong province, China.

Zhuhai Zhongfu Enterprises Co. has been listed on the Shenzhen market since 1996.

== Ownership and history ==
It was established in 1982 and listed on the Shenzhen Stock Exchange in 1996.

CVC Capital Partners acquired a 29% stake in the company in 2007, paying $US225 million. This made CVC the largest single shareholder in the company. CVC Asia-Pacific appointed three executives to Zhongfu, including Russell Jones, former CEO of Amcor. William Ho became CVC managing director.

As of 2015, it was listed on the Shenzhen Stock Exchange. In 2015, Zhuhai Zhonghai Enterprise Co. defaulted on $100 million worth of bonds, only making a partial payment due to a "short-term liquidity problem," according to the company. That May, a banking consortium had rejected a loan application due to the consortium's lending cut. By 2016 it had borrowed money from Bank of Anshan to help repay debts related to the 2015 default.

== Operations ==
The company has operations throughout China and produces approximately 12 billion PET bottles a year. In 2015, it was then known as a China Coca-Cola bottler maker, and also supplied bottles for PepsiCo Inc. and Uni-President China Holdings. These three companies made up 33 percent of its revenue. Han Huiming was board secretary. It employed 4,000 and was not state-owned, and on the stock market. Assets were reported at 3.66 billion yuan, and borrowings were 2.58 billion yuan.
