= Teekanne =

German tea trading company

Teekanne GmbH & Co. KG
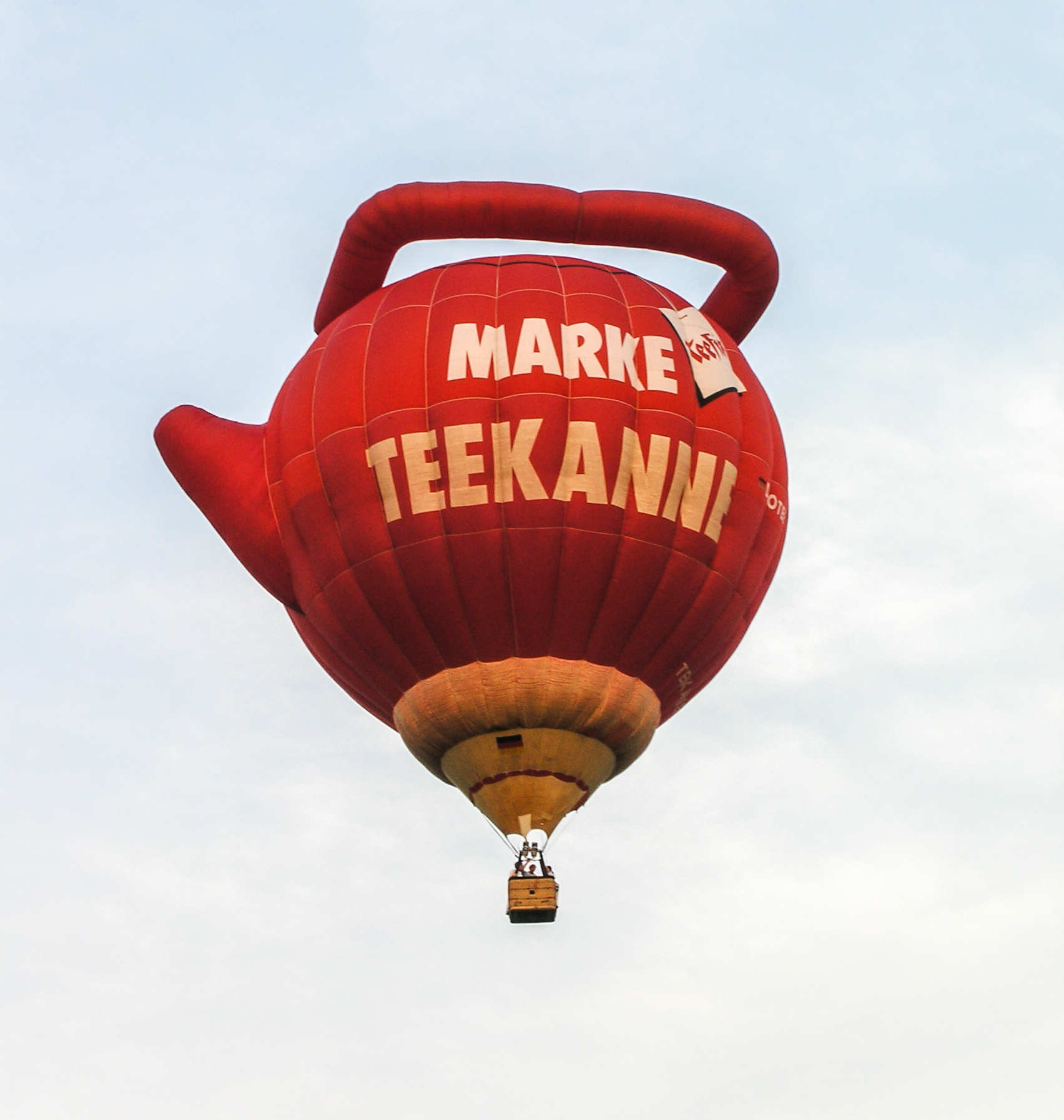
- Founded: 16 July 1882, Dresden
- Headquarters: Düsseldorf, Germany
- Number of employees: 1500
- Website: www.teekanne.com

Teekanne GmbH & CO. kg is a German tea trading company, based in Düsseldorf. The founders Rudolf Anders and Eugen Nissle were the first to sell tea in tins and already mixed teas on a high quality level. Furthermore, they went on to invent the machine-made tea bag. Today the family-run company produces 7.5 billion tea bags per year.

== History ==
Teekanne, then known under the name “R.Seelig & Hille”, was founded on 16 July 1882 in Dresden. In 1888 the company was renamed “Theekanne”, old German spelling for "Teekanne", meaning "teapot", and registered as a trademark. The registration number 6541 makes it one of Germany´s oldest trademarks still existing. The two employees Eugen Nissle and Rudolf Anders bought the company in 1892; the first to sell blended, packaged tea. The company has remained family-owned ever since.

In 1912 the tea brand “Teefix” was registered, along with the "Pompadour" brand.

During World War I, Teekanne provided soldiers and civilian with so called "tea bombs", a sweet portion of tea in small gauze bags. These handmade bags were the precursor to the modern tea bag

In 1929 the first tea bag packing machine worldwide was launched, designed by Adolf Rambold, an employee of the company. The “Pompadour” machine could produce 35 gauze bags in one minute.

In 1931 the next generation, Ernst Rudolf Anders and Johannes Nissle, took over the family business. Anders took part in the trip of the LZ 129 Hindenburg in the US 1937 and died during the Hindenburg explosion in Lakehurst, United States.

During the last days of World War II, Dresden and Teekanne took heavy damage. In 1946 the restoration of the company began in modest surroundings in Viersen, Germany, on the Lower Rhine.

In 1948 a company for the production of tea bags was founded, called “Teepack”. Adolf Rambold became co-owner and unveiled his fully automatic tea bag machine, the "Constanta", in 1949. It produced up to 160 double chamber tea bags a minute. The revolutionary double chamber tea bag was protected by patent.

The company moved his head offices to Düsseldorf in 1957.

The further development of the “Constanta” was launched: the “Perfecta”. It produced 400 double chamber bags in a minute and is sold worldwide.

Teekanne Austria was founded in Salzburg with their own production in 1951. In 1996 it took over the sugar substitute brand "Kandisin" in Vienna, the market leader in the Austria.

In 1991 Teekanne returned to its roots and acquired Teehaus GmbH (formerly VEB Kaffee und Tee), in Radebeul near Dresden. This brought Teekanne back to Dresden, its original location.

2006 the German tennis legend Steffi Graf became the new face and brand ambassador of Teekanne.

Sixty years after the production was placed in Düsseldorf-Heerdt, Teekanne opened a new production hall. Due to the high efficiency it has been the latest production hall in Europe in 2014.

== Subsidiaries ==
The following companies belong to the Teekanne Group:

- Teepack Spezialmaschinen GmbH & Co. KG, Düsseldorf, Germany (1948)
- Teekanne Ges.m.b.H, Salzburg, Austria (1951)
- Pompadour Te srl GmbH, Bolzano, Italy (1964)
- Pompadour Iberica S.A, Alicante, Spain (1985)
- Teehaus GmbH, Radebeul/ Dresden, Germany (1991)
- Teekanne Polska, Kraków, Poland (1992)
- Teekanne s.r.o., Prague, Czech Republic (1994)
- Redco Foods Inc., Windsor, Connecticut, United States (1995)
  - Junket
  - Red Rose Tea (United States)
  - Salada (United States)
