= T2 (tea products company) =

Australian-based specialty tea brand

Tea Too
- Trade name: T2
- Type: Privately held company
- Industry: Tea products
- Founded: 1996; 30 years ago
- Headquarters: Melbourne, Victoria, Australia
- Number of locations: 70 (2024)
- Area served: Australia; Singapore; New Zealand
- Key people: Christelle Young (Managing Director)
- Revenue: A$57 million (2012–13 FY)
- Owner: Lipton Teas and Infusions
- Website: www.t2tea.com

T2, officially registered as Tea Too, is a chain of specialty tea shops that has stores in Australia, Singapore, and New Zealand. It was established in Melbourne, Australia, in 1996 and was purchased by Unilever in 2013. The chain has 40 stores globally and reported an annual turnover of $57 million AUD.

== History ==
T2 was co-founded by Maryanne Shearer and Jan O'Connor. In 1995, the pair registered a homewares company called Contents Homeware, which marked their early entry into retail before shifting focus to specialty tea.

== Ownership ==
=== Startup ===
In 1996, Jan O'Connor and Maryanne Shearer each invested $50,000 to launch the company as equal co-founders.

According to T2: The Book, Shearer stated that her business relationship with O'Connor began to deteriorate after she returned to work in March 2000 following the birth of her first child. This led to a legal dispute, ultimately resulting in O'Connor's departure from the business. In October 2001, Bruce Crome, Shearer's partner, purchased O'Connor's share in the company.

=== Investment partnership ===
In 2007, Maryanne Shearer and Bruce Crome sold 50 percent of T2 to retail investors Jonathan Dan and Phillip Blanco. Following disagreements over growth strategies, Shearer and Crome bought back 25 percent of the company from Blanco, while Dan retained his investment.

=== Acquisition by Unilever ===
Multinational company Unilever acquired T2 from Shearer and Crome in October 2013. As of 2015, Shearer was T2's Creative Director. In announcing the acquisition, Shearer highlighted Unilever's role in adopting sustainable agriculture practices for the tea industry as a good value fit for T2. T2 had worked with Fairtrade since 2009 on its English breakfast tea blend. In 2017, writer Jayne D'Arcy used the term "Unilever-ed", to describe the company's shift from being locally Melbourne-owned.

The purchase price was estimated to be less than $100 million and was later disclosed as $60 million. Legal services for T2 were provided by Baker & McKenzie and Harris Carlson, with financial advice from Deloitte. Legal services for Unilever were provided by Johnson Winter Slattery, with financial advice from KPMG.

Unilever reached an agreement in November 2021 to sell the majority of its tea business to private equity firm CVC Capital Partners for €4.5 billion, roughly US$5 billion. This included the T2 business. The sale was completed in July 2022, with the new company named LIPTON Teas and Infusions.

== Outlets and turnover ==
=== Stores ===
On 1 July 1996, the first store was opened at 340 Brunswick Street, Fitzroy, Melbourne, Victoria, Australia. A second store was opened on Fitzroy Street, St Kilda, but was closed after 12 months due to low patronage. However, the following year sales increased 20% which prompted the company to expand into Sydney.

In November 1999, a store was opened in Chadstone Shopping Centre, Melbourne. The success of this store helped to increase T2's revenue beyond $1 million.

In 2002, T2 expanded to Sydney with a store in King Street, Newtown. By 2004, the company had grown to six stores, and by 2005 to eight stores. At this time, the company had 55 team members with a total revenue of $4.4 million. In 2006, revenue was $8 million.

In 2008, T2 moved its operations from Fitzroy to a leased office in the Port Melbourne area. In August 2012, the company leased a warehouse at 50 Cyanamid Street in Laverton North. In September 2012, T2 leased a building at 35 Wellington Street in Collingwood, with the intention of relocating the head office to that location. In September 2012, the first Tasmanian T2 store was opened in the Cat & Fiddle Arcade, Hobart.

In May 2013, a T2 shop was opened at 269 Little Collins Street, Melbourne. That same year, T2 opened a store in Cairns Central.

In 2014, 18 new stores were opened. Three of the stores opened in London, England, United Kingdom, (including on Shoreditch High Street) and one in New York City, New York. A year later, a fourth London store was opened at 290 Regent Street, in the West End.

In 2017, the first T2 stores were opened in Scotland (131 Buchanan Street, Glasgow), and in Singapore, the first outlet in Asia. As of November 2017, there were over 96 stores across Australia, New Zealand, the United States and Asia.

In 2023, T2 announced that due to "unprecedented changes" of the past few years, they have decided to "close all operations in the Northern Hemisphere to focus on regions closer to home such as Australia, New Zealand and Singapore". T2's US stores closed on 19 February 2023, with its US websites trading until 22 February 2023 (with the exception of their Valley Fair location in California, which remained open until 25 June 2023).

=== Wholesale ===
Beginning in the mid-2000s, T2 was supplying tea to approximately 300 cafés and restaurants across Australia. Eventually, this number increased to 400, including a few international accounts.

By mid-2011, the number of wholesale accounts had grown to approximately 500. By 2015, T2 was supplying 3,000 wholesale accounts.

== Branding ==
T2 stores include tasting tables and ingredient stations, allowing customers to sample teas in‑store. Its interior design has been described as akin to an "apothecary-style" boutique, with dark interiors accented by orange and black colour schemes. The Shoreditch (London) location featured a custom tea fountain as part of its décor.

== Tea blends ==
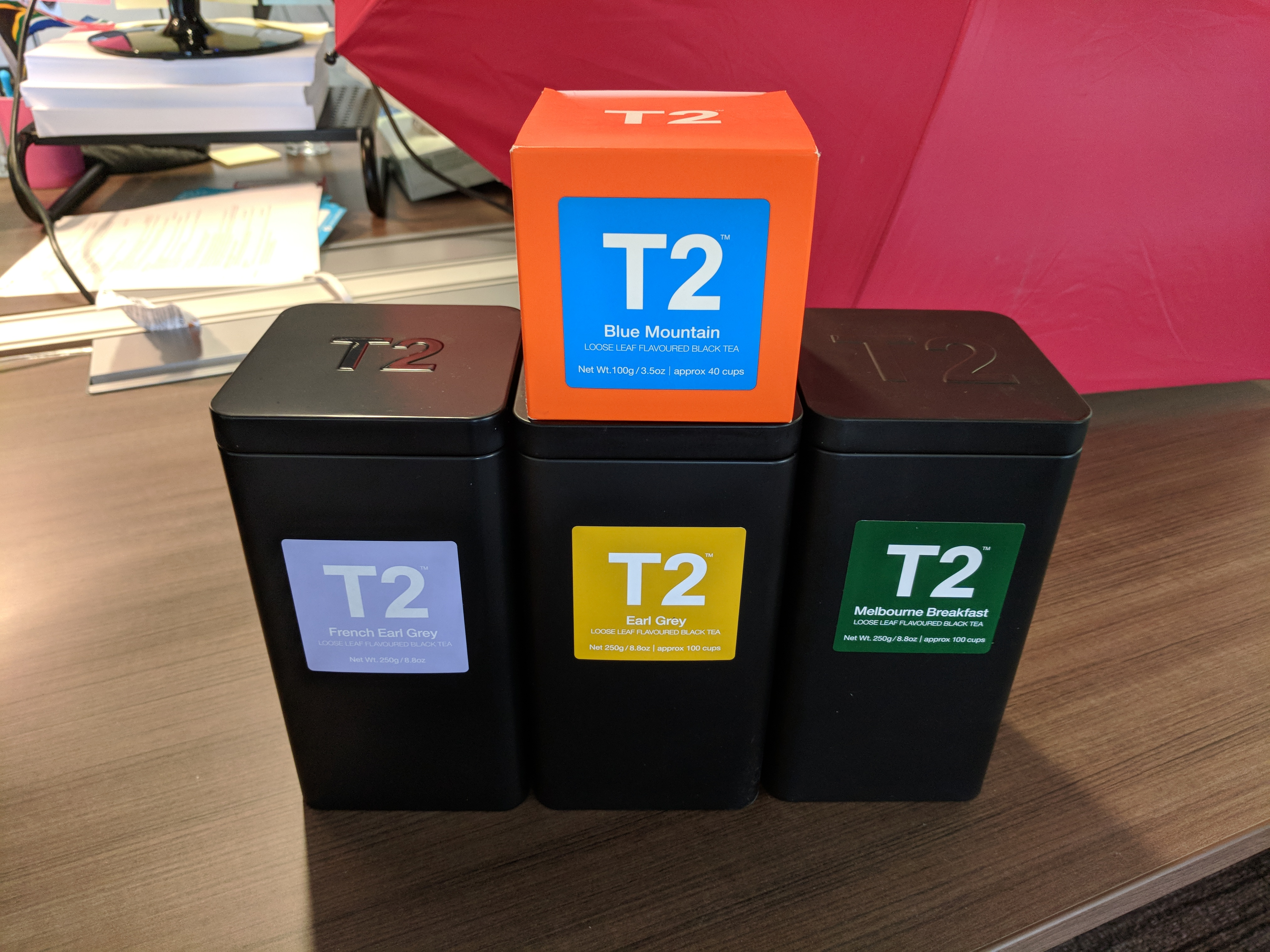
A small collection of teas from T2

T2 has 131 available teas and tea blends sold as loose leaf, powder, and tea bags. Some of its signature blends—such as Melbourne Breakfast (a black tea with vanilla) and Brisbane Breakfast (flavored with mango)—are named after Australian cities and were sold in multiple international locations.

== Awards and recognition ==
- Co‑founder Maryanne Shearer received the Veuve Clicquot Business Woman of the Year award in 2012
- The Shoreditch store in London won Store of the Year at the Retail Design Institute's International Design Competition in 2014, and the Collingwood headquarters was awarded Silver in the 2014 Melbourne Design Awards for corporate interiors
- The T2 Tea Cotton Teabags packaging designed by Christopher Stanko was a finalist in the 2015 Australian Packaging Design Awards (Beverage category)

In 2015, Shearer published T2: The Book, which discusses the company's history, profiles different types of tea, and recommends tea cups and brewing techniques. Kristen Droesch's February 2016 book review in Library Journal highlights the artistic details of T2's design, stating that it is "more than just an advertisement for T2".

T2: The Book was designed by Evi O and was a category winner for the Australian Book Designers Association's Best Designed Fully-illustrated Book under $50 in 2016.

== See also ==
- Tea in Australia
- List of oldest companies in Australia
- List of tea companies
