= TMF Group =

Dutch multinational company

TMF Group Worldwide
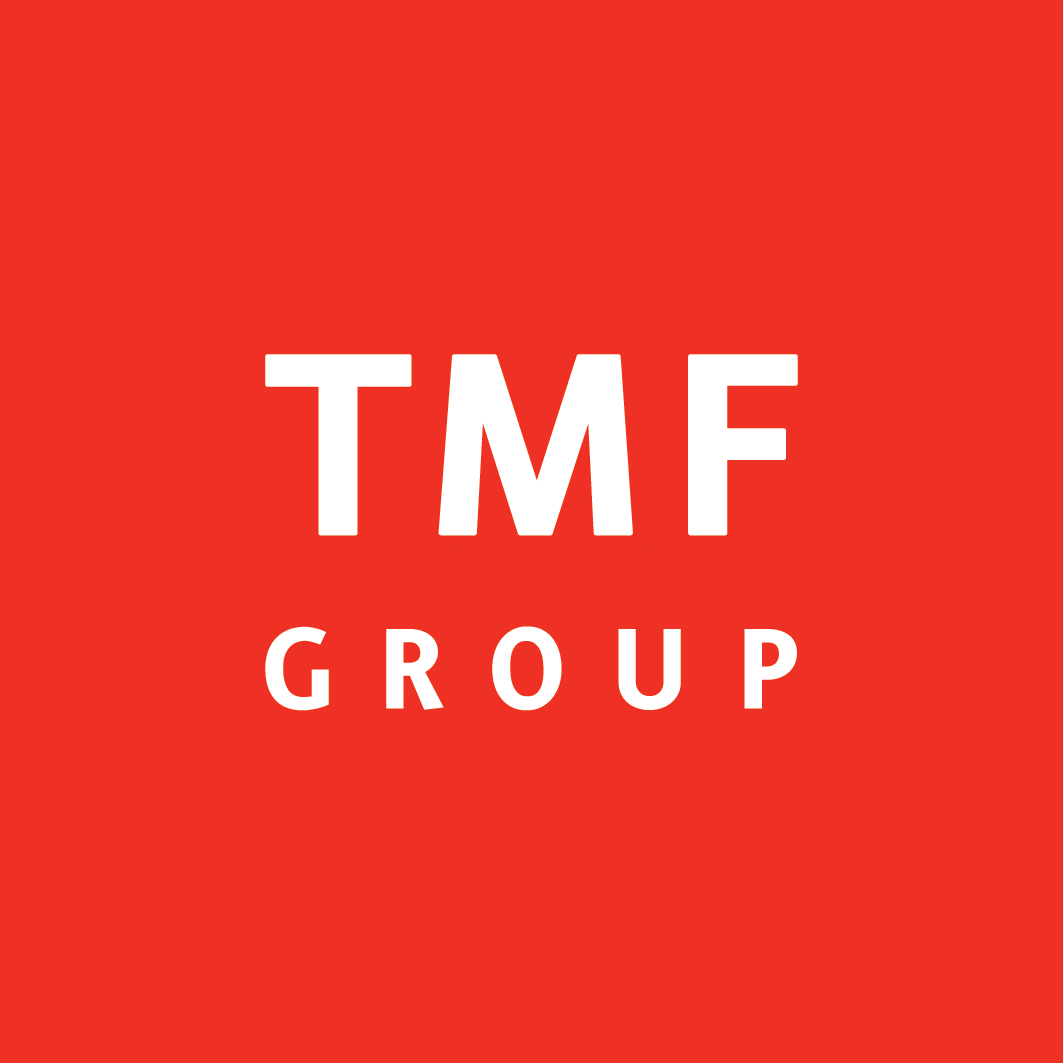
- Industry: Professional services
- Founded: 1988; 38 years ago
- Headquarters: Amsterdam, Netherlands
- Key people: Mark Weil (CEO), Patrick de Graaf (CFO),
- Services: Accounting and reporting services
- Revenue: ▲€ 744 million (2022)
- Operating income: ▲€ €235 million (2022)| €199 million (2021)
- Number of employees: 13000 (2026)
- Parent: CVC Capital Partners; Abu Dhabi Investment Authority
- Website: tmf-group.com

TMF Group B.V. (Trust Management Finance) is a Dutch multinational professional services firm headquartered in Amsterdam, Netherlands, providing accounting, tax, HR administration and global payroll services. As of October 2023, the company has 125 offices, 86 jurisdictions, and employs 10,000 people. It also has more than $215 billion in Assets Under Administration (AUA).

== History ==
TMF Group was founded in the Netherlands in 1988. Between 2006 and 2009, TMF Group made 47 acquisitions including departments of Ernst & Young, KPMG, Grant Thornton and Baker Tilly in countries like Brazil, Argentina, Mexico, China and Australia.

In October 2008, British private equity firm Doughty Hanson & Co bought TMF Group for €750 million. In January 2011, Doughty Hanson completed its €350 million acquisition of Equity Trust. This paved the way for TMF Group's merger with Equity Trust, which was completed at group level in June 2011.

In 2015, TMF Group acquired the Brazilian business process outsourcing unit from PwC, including delivery centers in Barueri, Rio de Janeiro and Ribeirão Preto, providing business process outsourcing services in finance & accounting, human resources, tax and compliance.

On 27 October 2017, TMF Group was acquired by Europe's largest private equity firm CVC Capital Partners for €1.75 billion.

In 2018, the Dutch supervisor De Nederlandsche Bank (DNB) imposed a EUR 594,000 fine on TMF for insufficient due diligence in the management of an entity which lent US$850 million to Mozambican parties, earmarked for a tuna fishery. Loan funds were embezzled or used by Defence. TMF Group's 2021 appeal against the ruling was unsuccessful. In 2023 followed an EUR 3,125,000 fine for insufficient Customer Due Diligence; out of the eight investigated files seven were not in good order.

In July 2022, CVC Capital Partners sold a near-50 per cent stake to the Abu Dhabi Investment Authority sovereign wealth fund, which will take a seat on TMF’s board. The deal valued the company at about €3 billion.

In 2023, TMF Group completed a series of acquisitions in Ireland (Goodbody), India (KPK faServ), Malta (Avanzia Taxand), Greece (Premier Consulting), and Romania (Contexpert), contributing approximately €12.4 million in additional revenue and €13.3 million in goodwill.

In January 2025, TMF Group acquired the BPS (business process services) division of RSM. This transfer further expands the firm's compliance and administrative services in Latin America and Brazil.

In July 2025, TMF Group partnered with the international banking network, IBOS Association (IBOS), with the aim to support cross-border operations and widen client access to global markets.

== Operations and services ==
TMF Group provides professional services focused on global compliance, payroll, accounting, and fund administration.

In the area of payroll services, TMF Group was ranked as a "Leader" in the 2023 and 2024 editions of the Multi-Country Payroll (MCP) Solutions PEAK Matrix Assessment conducted by Everest Group. The firm was recognized for the breadth of its services and its ability to deliver payroll solutions across a large number of jurisdictions.
