= Hardy McLain =

American hedge fund manager

- Born: Bruce Hardy McLain; September 1952 (age 73–74); San Francisco, US
- Education: Duke University; UCLA
- Occupation: hedge fund manager
- Known for: co-founder and former managing partner, CVC Capital Partners
- Spouse: Helle McLain
- Children: 6

Bruce Hardy McLain (born September 1952) is an American retired hedge fund manager, and a co-founder and former managing partner of CVC Capital Partners.

== Early life ==
Bruce Hardy McLain was born in September 1952, in San Francisco, US.

McLain earned a bachelor's degree in economics and public policy from Duke University, North Carolina, followed by an MBA in finance and marketing from UCLA, California.

== Career ==
In December 2012, McLain retired after 25 years with CVC.

McLain has been a non-executive director of Samsonite International since June 2014, and Formula One, the Colomer Group and the Lecta Group.

== Personal life ==
McLain lives in London with his wife Helle and six children.

In May 2017, he gave £100,000 to the Conservative Party. In May 2020 he donated another £50,000 to the Tories.
