= George Wade (pottery manufacturer) =

English pottery manufacturer (1891–1986)

Colonel Sir George Albert Wade MC
- Born: 19 July 1891; Burslem, England
- Died: 27 January 1986 (aged 94)
- Known for: Wade Ceramics
- Spouse: Florrie Johnson
- Children: 3

Colonel Sir George Albert Wade (19 July 1891 – 27 January 1986) was an English pottery manufacturer. Born in Burslem to a family who ran a pottery business, he was knighted in 1955 for political and public services.

Wade was a pupil at Newcastle High School, which has been amalgamated into the Newcastle-under-Lyme School, and left at age 15 to work at the family's pottery factory. He was a soldier between 1914 and 1919 in World War I, first as a private with the North Staffordshire Regiment, and then as a lieutenant with the South Staffordshire Regiment in the Machine Gun Corps, and he served in France and Egypt. He married Florrie Johnson in 1915.

Wade became chairman of the family's pottery business, Wade Ceramics Ltd, a manufacturer of porcelain and earthenware, whose main factory was in Burslem, Stoke-on-Trent. In the 1950s, Wade Ceramics created and manufactured "Whimsies", small cheap solid porcelain animal figures, which became popular and collectable in Britain and America.

Wade never fully stopped working, but in the early 1980s, he gave the routine running of the business to his son George Anthony (Tony) Johnson Wade.

His hobbies included painting and ornithology.
