= OANDA =

American foreign exchange company

- Type: Subsidiary
- Industry: Financial services
- Founded: 1996; 30 years ago
- Founders: Michael Stumm and Richard Olsen
- Headquarters: 17 State Street, Suite 300, New York, US
- Key people: Otakar Šuffner (co-CEO), Marek Vašíček (co-CEO)
- Products: Online trading, foreign exchange data, currency conversion
- Parent: FTMO
- Website: oanda.com

OANDA is a company providing online trading, foreign exchange data and currency conversion services. Founded in 1996, the company launched its data services in 2001. The company was sold to a Czech company in 2025 for approximately $422 million.

== History ==
OANDA was founded in 1996 by Michael Stumm and Richard Olsen. It grew out of a Zurich-based econometrics company associated with Olsen and initially focused on providing exchange rate information and online currency conversion. In 2001, OANDA launched an online foreign exchange trading platform for retail investors.

The company has received several rounds of investment. Index Ventures invested US$17 million in OANDA in 2005, its first round of institutional financing. Two years later, OANDA received a further US$100 million from investors led by New Enterprise Associates, with participation from Legg Mason, T. Rowe Price and Cascade Investment.

Olsen stepped down in 2012. OANDA was acquired by a fund managed by CVC Capital Partners in 2018. CVC agreed to sell OANDA to Czech trading company FTMO in 2025. FTMO's financial statements later showed that the acquisition cost approximately US$422 million.

== Products and services ==
OANDA provides online trading services as well as foreign exchange data and analytics. Its trading businesses offer different financial instruments depending on the jurisdiction, including foreign exchange and derivatives linked to stock indices, commodities, equities and precious metals. OANDA also provides currency-data services for businesses, including an exchange rates API. Its currency converters provide current and historical exchange rate information. In 2012, HSBC launched a margin foreign exchange trading service for eligible retail customers in Hong Kong using OANDA's trading platform.

== Regulatory matters ==
In August 2020, the Commodity Futures Trading Commission (CFTC) ordered OANDA Corporation to pay a US$500,000 civil penalty for violations of capital, reporting and supervision requirements. The CFTC found that OANDA had at times failed to meet minimum net-capital requirements and had breached restrictions on equity withdrawals. It also identified reporting and supervision failures. The regulator did not find customers had suffered losses as a result of the violations. A whistleblower who brought another issue to the CFTC's attention, leading to the investigation, did not receive a payout.

In May 2025, the National Futures Association (NFA) ordered OANDA to pay a US$600,000 fine and to make a good-faith effort to reimburse customers affected by a pricing-display issue. The reimbursements were expected to be up to US$428,592.26, but OANDA settled without admitting or denying the allegations.
