= Steven Smith (teamaker) =

American businessperson

Steven Dean Smith (May 29, 1949 – March 23, 2015) was an American tea entrepreneur, best known as the founder of Tazo tea company, co-founder of Stash Tea Company, and co-founder of Steven Smith Teamaker in Portland, Oregon. Smith was recognized internationally as one of the tea industry's leading entrepreneurs, and often spoke to various industry groups about branding, product development, and origin projects. He was an active investor in, and consultant to, multiple business ventures in North America and abroad. A philanthropist, Smith supported numerous community projects locally and internationally, ranging from work with Mercy Corps to local schools and arts organizations, creating special tea blends for the Oregon Ballet Theatre and the Oregon College of Art and Craft.

== Beginnings ==
Steven Smith was born on May 29, 1949, and raised in Portland, Oregon. His first introduction to tea came at the home of his grandmother. Smith's father, Daniel Smith, imported and sold an eclectic array of used foreign cars. His mother, born Verla Slick, known as "Babe," was a grocery cashier, bowling enthusiast and partner at Cornucopia, one of the first coffee, tea, and spice shops in Portland. After graduating in 1967 from Franklin High School, Smith attended Portland State University and served aboard the USS Hancock during the Vietnam War. He completed his military service in 1971.

== Early career ==
As a manager of Sunshine Natural Foods, the first natural foods shop in Portland, Smith co-founded Stash Tea Company in 1972 with partners Stephen Lee and Dave Leger and investors Tom Mesher and Jay Garner. Noting the interest in their teas and herbal blends by university and college students outside of Portland, the partners started the mail order division, which was run out of Smith's barn by Smith's then-wife Teri (formerly Schwarz; now Duncan) with Leslie Lee and Colleen Leger. Stash introduced herbal and specialty black teas to retail and food service accounts throughout North America, eventually growing to become one of the largest-selling food service specialty tea brands in America. During this time, Smith also started Universal Tea Company, which traded in wild-crafted botanicals. In 1975, Smith, Lee, and Leger pioneered the market for domestic peppermint and spearmint, selling Oregon-grown mint to Lipton, Celestial Seasonings, and others.

Stash Tea Company was acquired by Yamamotoyama, the oldest tea company in Japan, in 1993.

== Tazo ==
Following the sale of Stash, Smith launched Tazo tea company in January 1994. Created in collaboration with the Sandstrom Partners design firm and writer Steve Sandoz, the Tazo brand blended the history and myth of tea cultures with a unique sense of humor. Marketed as "The Reincarnation of Tea," Tazo found distribution in retail stores and foodservice operations throughout North America. As Tazo's "certified tea shaman," Smith is credited with developing over 60 proprietary blends in multiple beverage formats.

Smith was joined in his Tazo venture by early investors Stephen Lee and Tom Mesher. Tal Johnson, formerly of Endeavour Capital, came aboard as CEO in 1995. Shortly thereafter, in October 1996, he married Kim DeMent on the Makaibari tea estate in Darjeeling, India. The ceremony was presided over by a Hindu priest and Buddhist Rinpoche and witnessed by Smith's daughter, Carrie Smith.

In January 1999, simultaneous with the birth of son Jack, Tazo was acquired by Starbucks Coffee Company. Smith and his team continued to lead the company until January 2006.

Smith also conceptualized and implemented the CHAI Project in 2002, a collaboration of Tazo, Starbucks, Mercy Corps, and Tazo supply chain partners to positively impact the lives of people in the tea-producing region of Darjeeling and Assam.

== Steven Smith Teamaker ==
Retiring from Tazo in 2006, Smith moved to Avignon, France with his wife, Kim, and their young son. The family returned to Portland in 2008. Inspired by the fine chocolatiers and winemakers of Provence, Smith and his wife co-founded the Steven Smith Teamaker brand in 2009, once again working with Sandstrom Partners and other members of his former Tazo team, including Tony Tellin, who had been trained by Smith and quickly became Smith's chief taster. The Smith Teamaker line includes full leaf black, green and white teas as well as herbal infusions and blends packaged in individual sachets and loose form, as well as ready-to-drink tea beverages made with water that has been infused with ripe fruit though a proprietary process called "fruitsmithing".

== Death and legacy ==
Smith died of liver cancer in Portland on March 23, 2015. An urn containing his ashes is on display inside the tasting room of the Southeast Portland Steven Smith Teamaker cafe.

In addition to the CHAI Project, Smith was an active supporter of numerous community projects and causes, the support sometimes taking the form of blends made especially for the organization. This work included the Portland International Film Festival, Oregon Ballet Theatre, Oregon College of Art and Craft, the Caldera Arts Center, and the Mercy Corps School Education Retention Project (SERP) as well as in kind donations, including to local schools, community projects, and larger foundations.

Smith Teamaker is now headed by his wife Kim DeMent Smith.
