= Tazo =

Tea & herbal tea manufacturer and distributor

Tazo Tea Company
- Type: Subsidiary
- Industry: Beverage
- Founded: 1994; 32 years ago in Portland, Oregon
- Founder: Steven Smith
- Headquarters: Kent, Washington, United States
- Area served: Global
- Products: Teas and herbal teas
- Number of employees: Approximately 50 (2010)
- Parent: Lipton Teas and Infusions
- Website: www.tazo.com

Tazo Tea Company (TAZO) is a tea and herbal tea blender and distributor founded in Portland, Oregon. It is now a Lipton Teas and Infusions division and is based in Kent, Washington.

== History ==
Tazo (/ˈtɑːzoʊ/) Tea was founded in 1994 by Steven Smith. The manufacturing and distribution was maintained by North American Tea & Coffee, a Canadian-based food manufacturing company.

Tazo approached then Starbucks CEO Howard Schultz in 1998, seeking further investment partners. The company was purchased by Starbucks in 1999 for $8.1 million.

Starbucks opened the first Tazo-branded tea shop in November 2012. It closed a year later and was converted into a Teavana store.

In November 2017, Starbucks sold Tazo to Unilever for $384 million.

Unilever reached an agreement in November 2021 to sell the majority of its tea business to private equity firm CVC Capital Partners for €4.5 billion. This included the Tazo business. The sale was completed in July 2022, with the new company named Lipton Teas and Infusions.

== Marketing ==
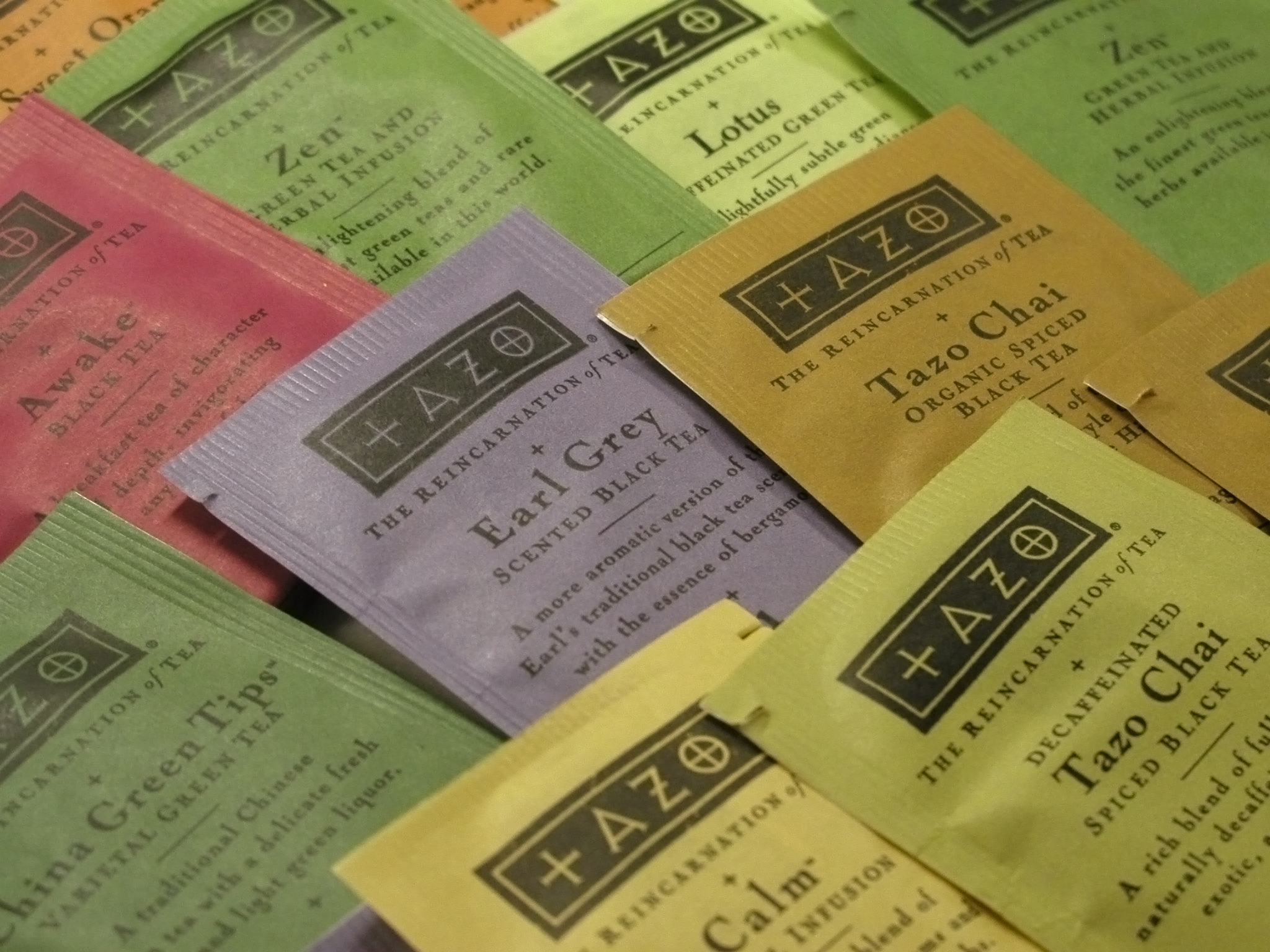
A selection of Tazo teas, showing the pre-2006 logo

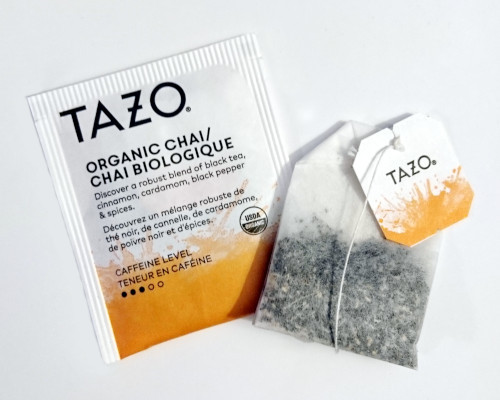
An organic chai tea bag, showing the Tazo logo used since 2013

The company uses "New Age"-style marketing and product labeling. For example, every box of tea was once labeled as "blessed by a certified tea shaman" and an original tag line was "The Reincarnation of Tea."

Until 2013, the logo used the Exocet typeface, slightly modified. For example, the T in Tazo was changed for readability purposes in 2006 by sliding the cross-piece toward the top of the letter.

== See also ==
- Lipton Teas and Infusions
