= Curdling =

Breaking of an emulsion as a new liquid

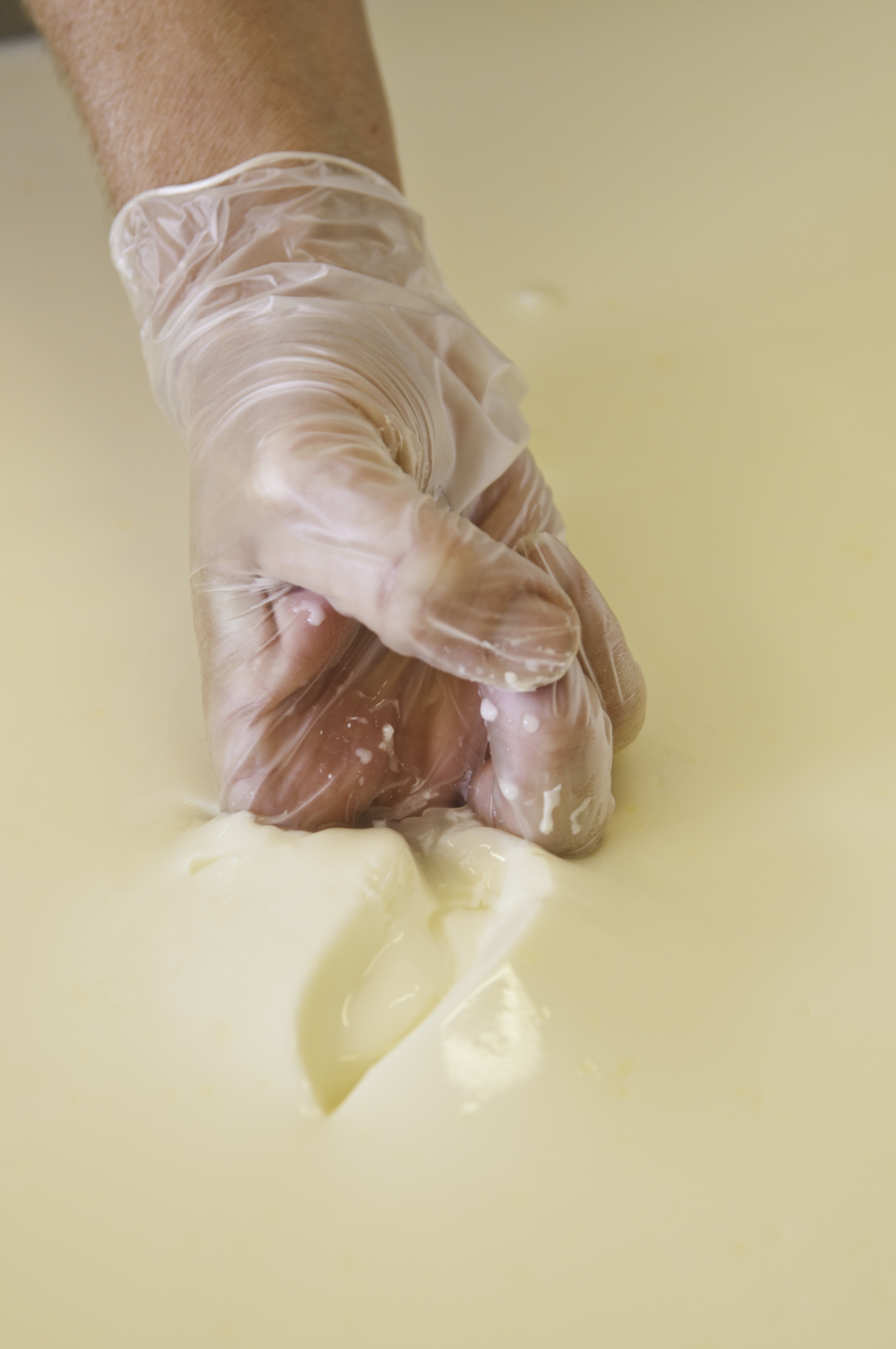
A cheesemaker checks the set of milk curd after vegetable rennet was added to milk

Curdling is the breaking of an emulsion or colloid into large parts of different composition through the physio-chemical processes of flocculation, creaming, and coalescence. Curdling is purposeful in the production of cheese curd and tofu, but undesirable in the production of a sauce, cheese fondue or a custard.

== Method ==
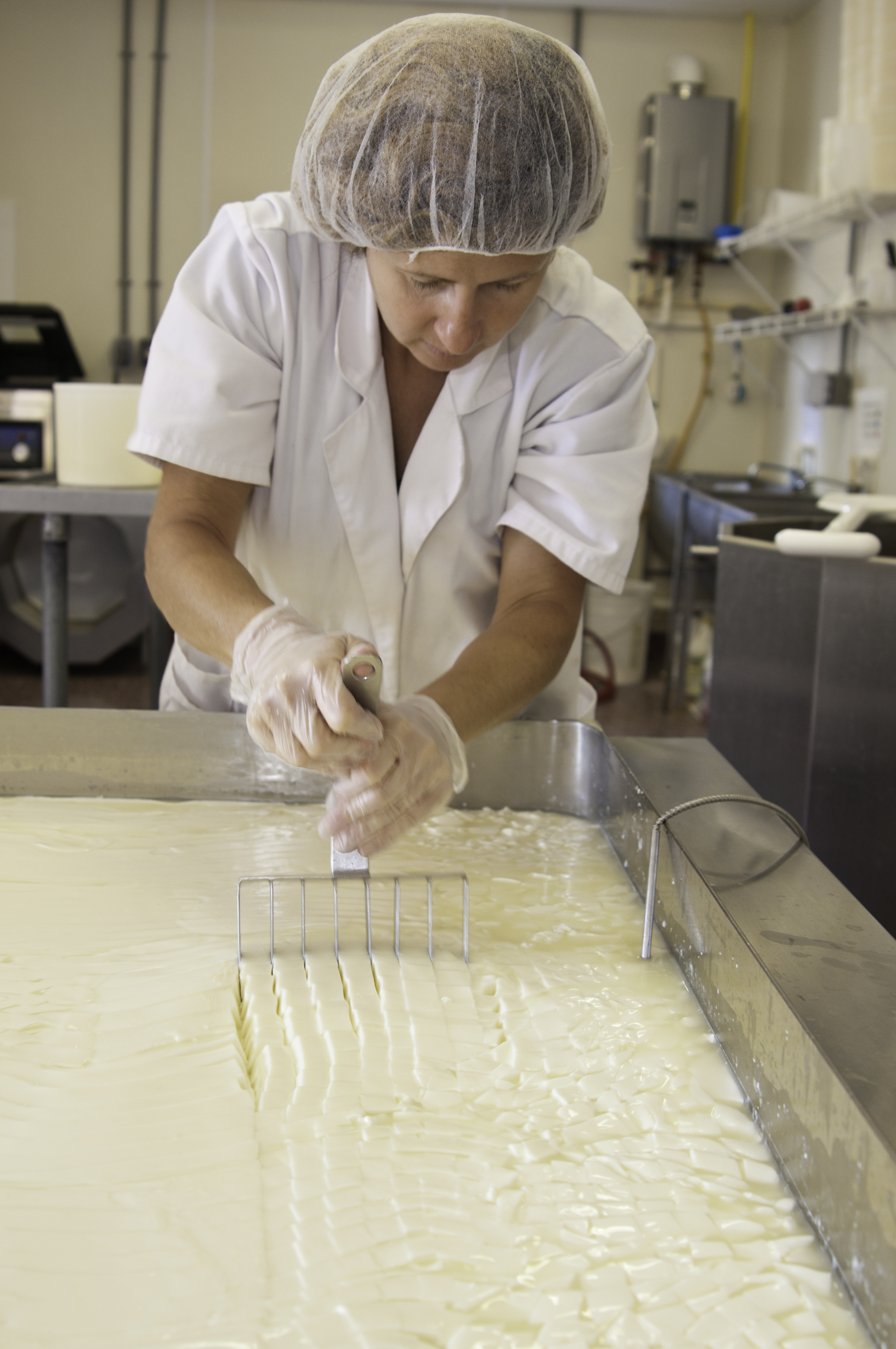
A curd knife is used to cut milk curd into small cubes

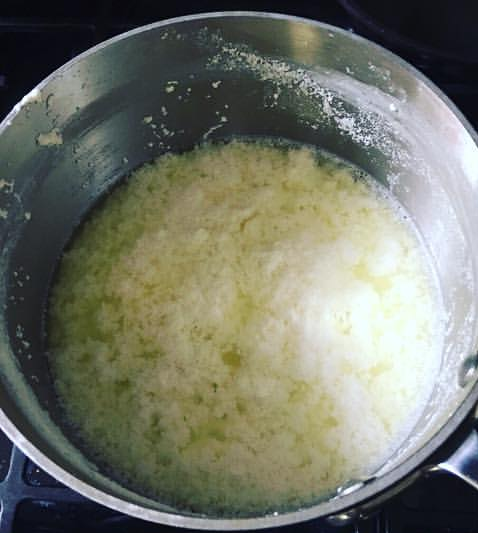
A pan of curdled milk

In curdling, the pH of the milk decreases and becomes more acidic. Independently floating casein molecules attract one another, forming "curdles" that float in a translucent whey. At warmer temperatures, the clumping reaction occurs more quickly than at colder temperatures. Curdling occurs naturally if cows' milk is left open in a warm environment to air for a few days.

== Cheese and tofu ==
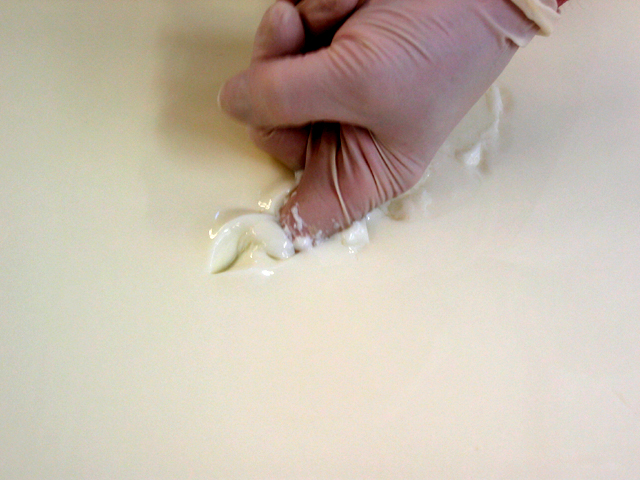
Cheese curd prior to pressing

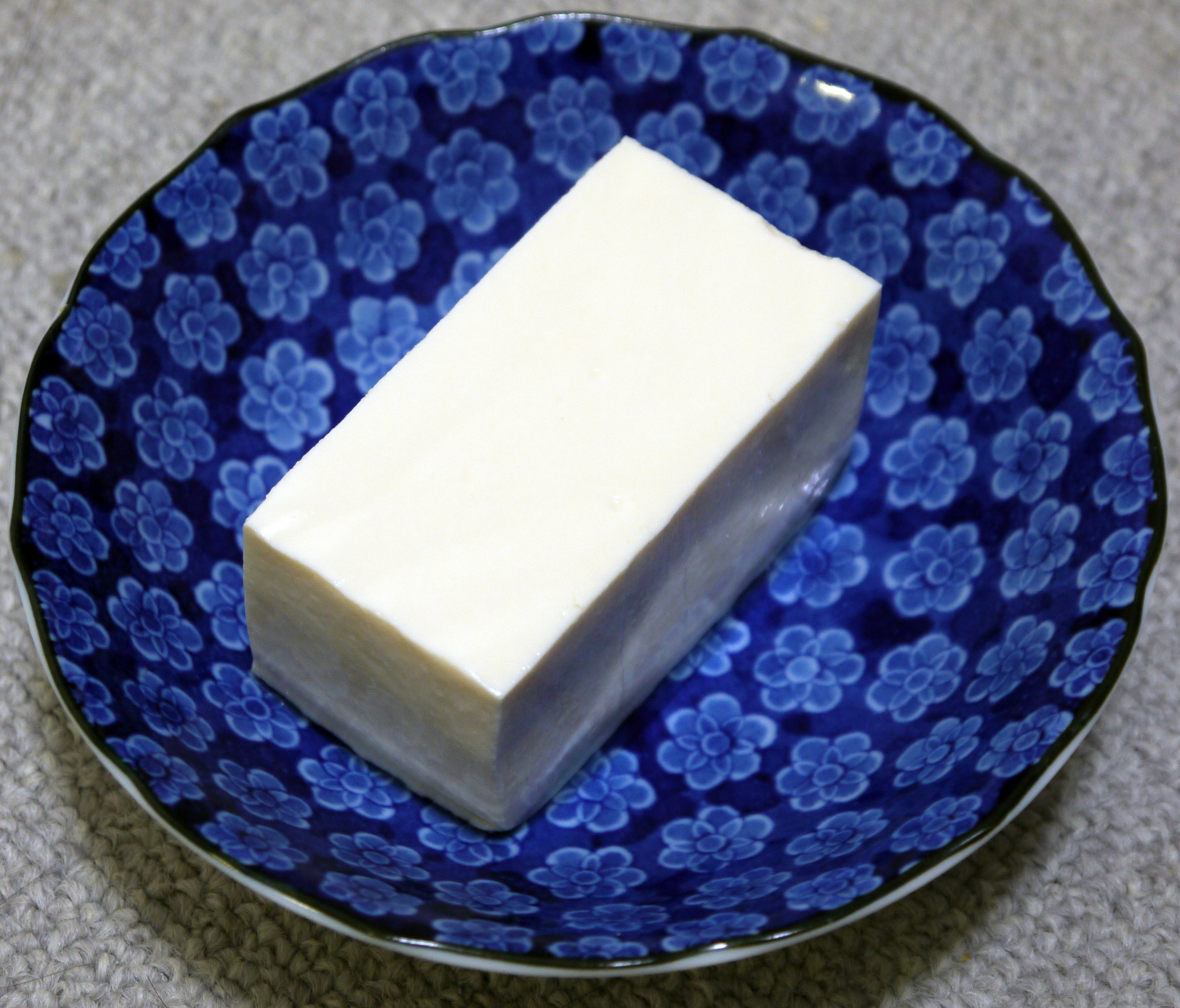
Silky tofu (kinugoshi tofu)

Milk and soy milk are curdled intentionally to make cheese and tofu by the addition of enzymes (typically rennet), acids (including lemon juice), or various salts (magnesium chloride, calcium chloride, or gypsum); the resulting curds are then pressed.

== Egg sauces ==
In hot preparations emulsified with eggs like hollandaise and custard, curdling is the undesirable result of overheating the sauce. Sauces which contain starch curdle with more difficulty.

In cold sauces like mayonnaise as well as in hot sauces, too large a ratio of fat to egg may also cause curdling.

== Milk sauces ==
In sauces which include milk or yogurt, overheating often causes curdling. The higher the fat content, the less likely curdling is. Strained yogurt used in sauces also curdles only with difficulty.

== Coffee ==
When a plant based milk such as soya milk is added to coffee, curdling can sometimes occur. To help prevent this manufacturers sometimes add acidity regulators.

== Cheesecake ==
When making cheesecake, if water is added to the cream cheese during the combining period, it will curdle.

== See also ==
- Cottage cheese
- Junket

== Bibliography ==
- Harold McGee, On Food and Cooking: The Science And Lore Of The Kitchen, 1984–2004.
- Bethany Moncel "Why Does Milk Curdle". Foodreference.about.com.
