= Junket (dessert) =

Dessert made with sweetened milk and rennet

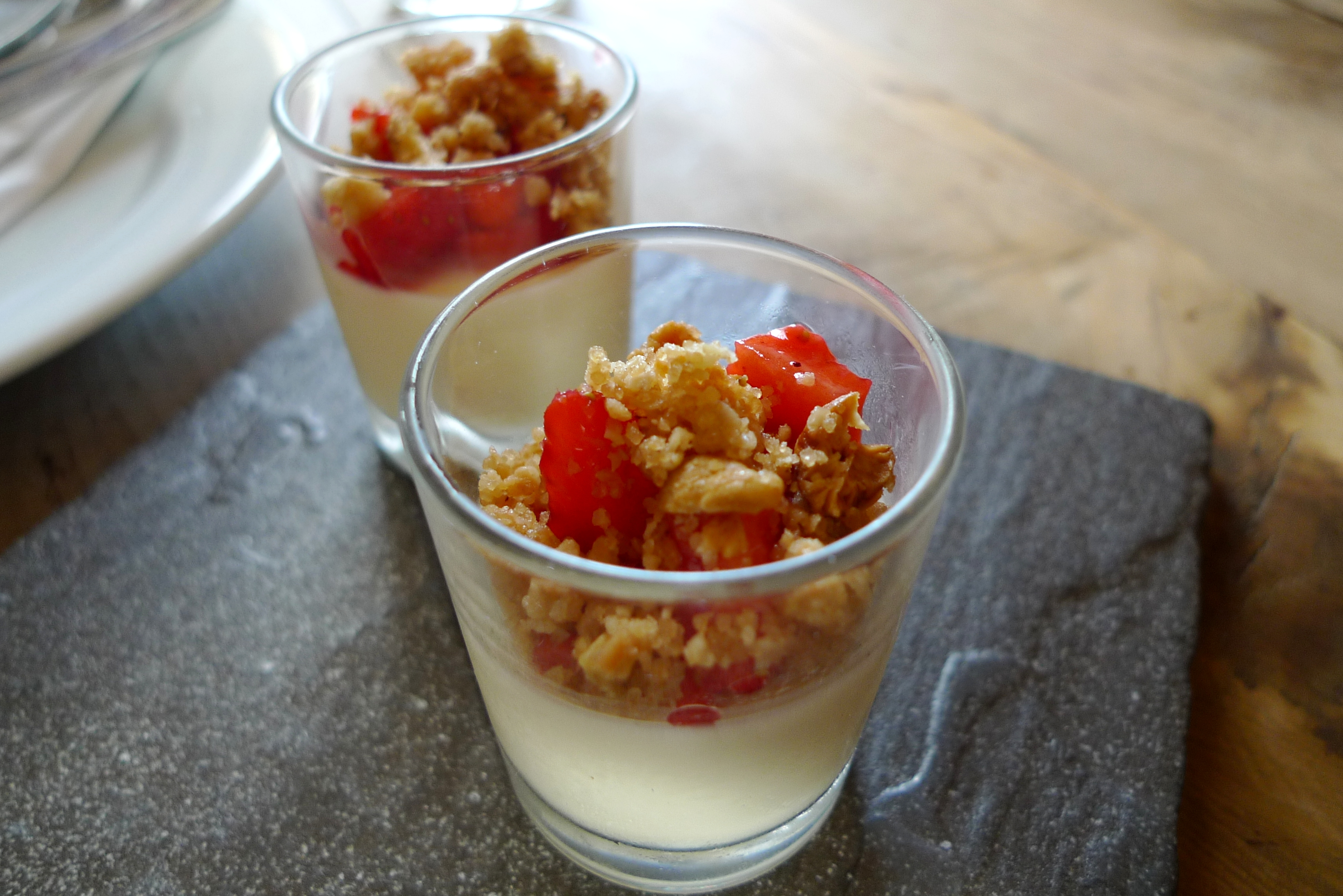
- A jasmine tea junket
- Type: Pudding
- Main ingredients: Sweetened milk, rennet, sugar, vanilla

Junket is a milk-based dessert with a jelly texture, made with sweetened milk and rennet, the digestive enzyme that curdles milk. It is usually set in a mould and served cold.

Some similar desserts are cuajada, ostkaka, blancmange, panna cotta, tavuk göğsü, almond tofu, haupia and tembleque.

== Preparation ==
To make junket, milk (usually with sugar and vanilla added) is heated to approximately 100°F and the rennet, which has been dissolved in water, is mixed in to cause the milk to set. The dessert is chilled prior to serving. Junket is often served with a sprinkling of grated nutmeg on top.

== History ==
Junket evolved from an older French dish, jonquet, a dish of renneted cream in which the whey is drained from curdled cream, and the remaining curds are sweetened with sugar.

In medieval England, junket was a food of the nobility made with cream and flavoured with rosewater, spices, and sugar. It started to fall from favour during the Tudor era, being replaced by syllabubs on fashionable banqueting tables, and by the 18th century, had become an everyday food sold in the streets.

Dorothy Hartley, in her Food in England from 1954, has a section on rennet followed by a section on "Junkets, Curds and Whey or Creams". She cites rum as the most common flavouring, and clotted cream as the usual accompaniment. She notes that the practice of heating the milk is a new one; originally, junket was made with milk as it was obtained from the cow, already at body temperature.

== Etymology ==
The word's etymology is uncertain. It may be related to the Norman jonquette (a kind of cream made with boiled milk, egg yolks, sugar, and caramel), or to the Italian giuncata or directly to the medieval Latin juncata. The first recorded use as a food is in The boke of nurture, folowyng Englondis gise.

The word may also derive from the French jonches, a name for freshly made milk cheese drained in a rush basket, which itself derives from jonquet, the name for such a basket.

== See also ==
- Junket (company)
- Ginger milk curd, a similar dessert of enzyme-curdled milk
