= Red Rose Tea =

Canadian beverage company

- Type: Private Limited company
- Industry: Tea
- Founded: 1890; 136 years ago, Saint John, New Brunswick
- Headquarters: Toronto, ON, Canada
- Owner: Teekanne (US); Lipton Teas and Infusions (Canada)

Red Rose Tea is a Canadian-based tea company owned by Lipton Teas and Infusions. It was established by Theodore Harding Estabrooks in 1890 in Saint John, New Brunswick, Canada. Estabrooks began his career in trade imports and exports, and soon moved specifically to the tea trade. Realizing the inconsistency in loose leaf servings, Estabrooks began packaging his tea leaves into single-serving bags to ensure quality and consistency in every teacup.

Red Rose's older advertisements introduced the catchphrase, "Only in Canada, you say? Pity..." (The catchphrase was sometimes transformed in television commercials and Canadian popular culture to, "Only in Canada, eh? Pity...") However, as their brand expanded, these slogans became less relevant to their market audience. Instead, they opted for more general slogans such as: "Red Rose Tea is Good Tea." and "A cup'll do you good."

Estabrooks retired in 1932 and sold the company to Brooke, Bond & Company in England, who opened a second branch in Montreal. The company was sold to Unilever Foods in 1985, who then sold the rights to sell the Red Rose brand in the United States to Redco Foods (which was sold again in 1995 to Teekanne in Germany). The brand is owned by Lipton Teas and Infusions in Canada and by Redco Foods, a subsidiary of Teekanne in the US. Since 2018, Red Rose tea in the US has been produced under license by Harris Tea Company.

== Tea selection ==
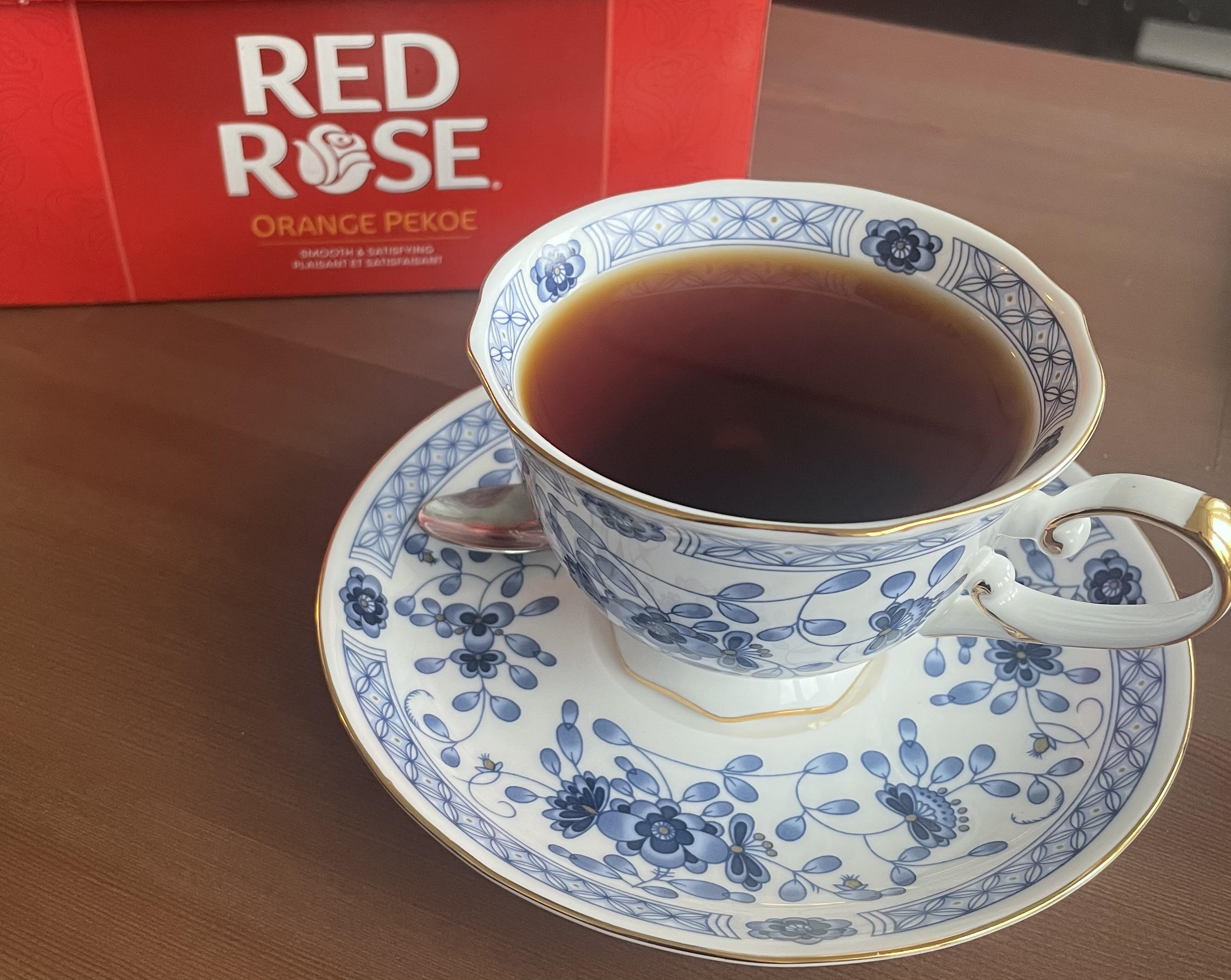
A cup of Red Rose orange pekoe tea

Red Rose Tea is sold in both Canada and the United States, though the two markets offer different products.

The US's Original Blend—a blend of orange pekoe and pekoe cut black teas—differs from Canada's Orange Pekoe, which is blended entirely within the orange pekoe grade, owing to the separate ownership of the US and Canadian brands.

In Canada, Red Rose Tea is sold exclusively as Orange Pekoe; the US brand offers numerous additional specialty flavors and herbal teas.

== Collectible premiums ==
From the 1950s through the 1970s packages of Red Rose Tea included premiums, including at various times fortune telling tea cups with saucers, for use in tasseography; collectible tea cards; and small ceramic figurines by Wade Ceramics, commonly called Wade whimsies.

=== Tea cups ===
There were three white tea cups with gold designs in the series of fortune telling cups, numbered 1, 2, and 3 on the bottom of each cup and saucer. They were manufactured in England by Taylor, Smith, and Taylor of fine bone china. A small illustrated booklet about tea leaf reading accompanied them.

=== Tea cards ===
Red Rose collectible tea cards were issued in annual series of 48 cards each, from 1959 through 1975.

Series	Name	Year
1	Songbirds of North America	1959
2	Animals of North America	1960
3	Wildflowers of North America	1961
4	Birds of North America	1962
5	Dinosaurs	1963
6	Tropical Birds	1964
7	African Animals	1965
8	Butterflies of North America	1966
9	Canadian/American Songbirds	1967
10	Transportation through the ages	1968
11	Trees of North America	1969
12	The Space Age	1970
13	North American Wildlife in Danger	1971
14	Exploring the Ocean	1972
15	Animals and their Young	1973
16	The Arctic	1974
17	Indians of Canada	1975

=== Miniature figurines ===
In 1967, Red Rose Tea began to give away miniature glazed porcelain figures made by the Wade Pottery company of England. The earliest giveaways took place only in Quebec, Canada, as part of a short-term promotion, but the promotion was soon extended to the entire country. During the 1970s, United States test markets for the figurines were opened in Pittsburgh, Pennsylvania and the Pacific Northwest states.

In 1983 the promotion began nationwide in the United States. Different series of figurines were produced for each country, such as the Canadian nursery rhyme characters which were never available in the US. This continued until 1985, when the Canadian series was almost identical to the US series of the same year. According to the company's website, "more than 300 million Wade figurines have been given away in packages of tea in America."

The Red Rose Tea promotion ended in 2018. Remaining figurines from several series are available directly from Red Rose Tea, but they are no longer packaged in boxes of teabags in stores. The primary source has shifted to the antique and resale market.

==== US Wade Series ====
- American Series #1, 1983–1985

Monkey, Lion, Buffalo, Bush Baby, Owl, Bear Cub, Rabbit, Squirrel, Bird, Otter, Hippo, Seal, Wild Boar, Turtle, Elephant.

- American Series #2, 1985–1994

Koala, Giraffe, Pine Marten, Langur, Gorilla, Camel, Kangaroo, Tiger, Zebra, Polar Bear, Orangutan, Raccoon, Rhino, Beaver, Leopard, Puppy, Kitten, Rabbit, Pony, Cockatiel. (the last 5 were added in 1990)

- Circus Series, 1994–1999

Bear, Standing Elephant, Rearing Elephant, Teapot Monkey, Teacup Monkey, Lion, Poodle, Seal, Horse, Tiger, Ringmaster, Human Cannonball, Strongman, Blue Clown, Green Clown. (the last 5 were added in 1996) There was also a circus ring display available separately.

- North American Endangered Animals Series, 1999–2002

Sturgeon, Manatee, Timber Wolf, Bald Eagle, Florida Panther, Polar Bear, Peregrine Falcon, Green Sea Turtle, Humpback Whale, Spotted Owl.

- Noah's Ark Series, 2002–2006

Noah & wife (single figure), male and female Elephant, male and female Rhino, male and female Zebra, Goose, Gander, Hen, Rooster, Ram, Ewe, Lion, Lioness. There was also a Noah's Ark display available separately.

- Pet Shop Series, 2006–2008

Labrador Retriever, Cat, Tropical Fish, Parrot, Kittens, Puppies, Pony, Rabbit, Turtle, Duck. There was also a pet shop display available separately.

- Calendar Series, 2008–2012

January: Snowman, February: Cupid, March: Leprechaun, April: Easter Bunny, May: Mother's Day Flowers, June: Graduation Cap & Books, July: Uncle Sam, August: Sandcastle, September: Scarecrow, October: Pumpkin Kitty, November: Turkey, December: Christmas Tree.

- Nautical Wonderland, 2012–2015

Compass, Conch Shell, Crab, Diver's Helmet, Lighthouse, Mermaid, Sail Boat, Gull, Seahorse, Ship's Wheel, Starfish, Treasure Chest.

- American Heritage, 2016–2018

Arrowhead, Bison, Boston Tea Party Crates, Covered Wagon, Liberty Bell, Space Shuttle, Steam Train, Three Corner Hat, Tractor, White House

The figurines are no longer distributed in either Canada or the United States. As of summer 2018 the figurines are only available with online orders, per promotional material inserted in the boxes sold in stores in place of the figurines.

== TV commercials ==
The Marquis Chimps appeared in three television commercials for Red Rose Tea in 1960. One had the apes playing golf, and another showed them as cowboys. The most popular ad, "Rock and Roll Tea Party," featured the chimps as plaid-suited musicians, playing a swinging jazz number at a fictitious "Savoy Ritz" night club in praise of Red Rose Tea. Chimpanzees had been advertising PG Tips (another Brooke Bond brand) since 1956 in the UK, and would continue to do so until the late 1990s. In 1968, Pittsburgh disc jockeys Zeke Jackson and Frank "Crazy D" DiMino played the "Rock and Roll Dance Party" soundtrack on their radio programs. Listener response was so enthusiastic that they licensed the song from Red Rose's parent company, Brooke Bond Foods, and issued it on a 45-rpm single. Record collector and producer Paul Mawhinney pressed 1000 copies of the tune for Jackson and DiMino on their own Gink label ("Red Rose Tea," Gink #9612, no artist credited); the record version extends the TV-commercial soundtrack by playing it through twice; and the "B" side is identical to the "A" side.
