= Yamamotoyama (company) =

Japanese tea and seaweed manufacturer

Yamamotoyama (Japanese: 山本山) is a Japanese tea and seaweed manufacturer which traces its company's roots to 1690, claiming to be the oldest tea company in the world. The company began as a tea shop in Nihonbashi, and pioneered the production of gyokuro green tea in 1835. Yamamotoyama expanded to the U.S. in 1975. It acquired Stash Tea Company in 1993.
