= Wade Ceramics =

English porcelain and earthenware manufacturer

Wade Ceramics Ltd
- Type: Private limited company
- Industry: Pottery
- Predecessor: Wade Potteries Ltd
- Founded: 1867
- Headquarters: Etruria, Stoke-on-Trent, England
- Area served: Worldwide
- Products: Porcelain and earthenware pottery
- Parent: Wade Allied Holdings Ltd
- Website: www.wade.co.uk

Wade Ceramics Ltd was a manufacturer of porcelain and earthenware, headquartered in Stoke-on-Trent, England. Its products include animal figures for its Collectors Club, whisky flagons, and a variety of industrial ceramics.

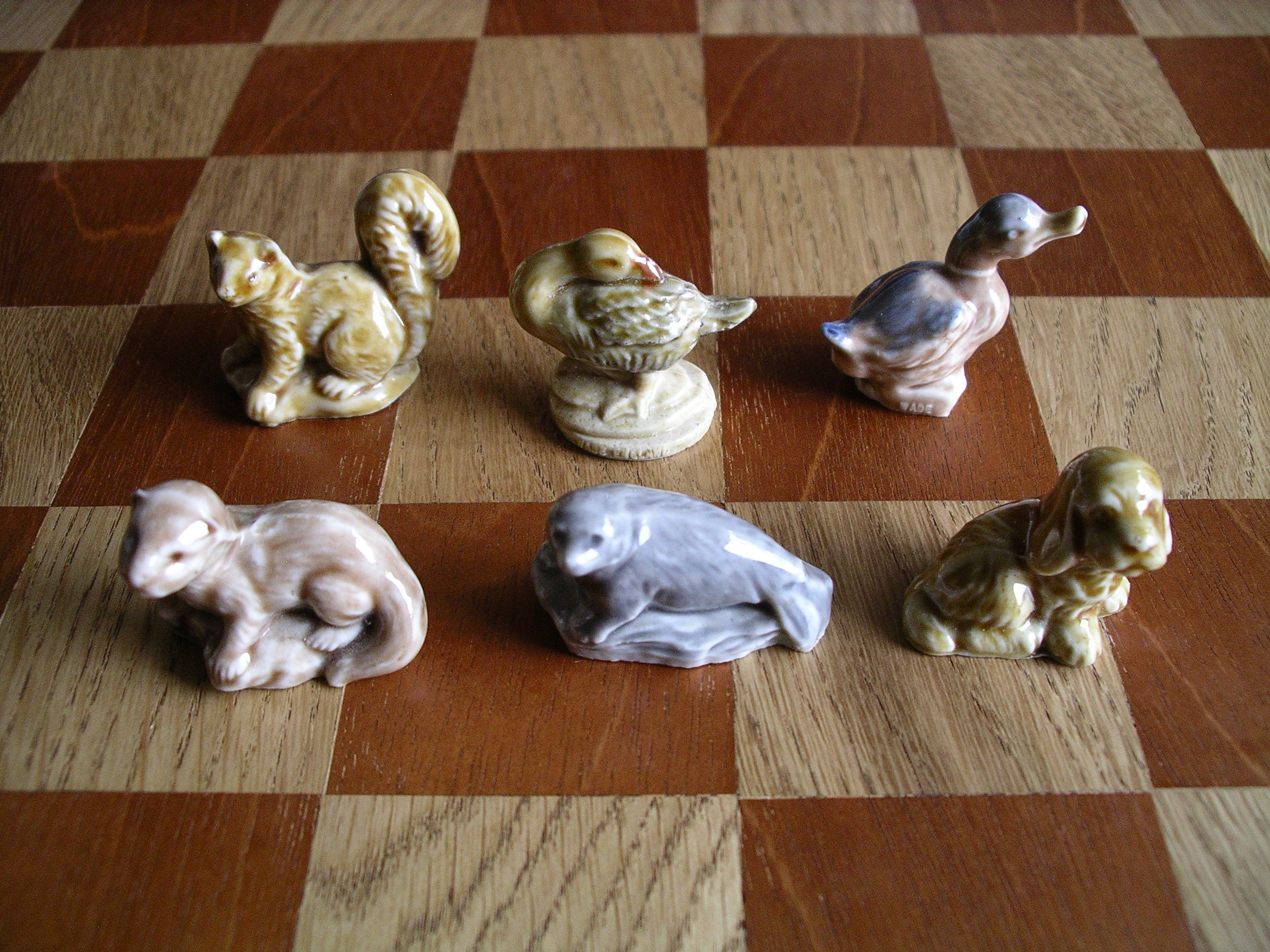
A selection of Wade 'Whimsies'

In the 1950s, the Wade potteries created 'Whimsies', small solid porcelain animal figures first developed by Sir George Wade, which became popular and collectable in Britain and America, following their retail launch in 1954, and were widely available in shops throughout the 1950s, 1960s, 1970s, and 1980s. The figurines have also been offered along with Red Rose Tea since 1967.

Its other brand names of inexpensive collectable porcelain include 'TV Pets', 'Whoppas', and 'Minikins'.

Wade has produced licensed pieces based on TV shows, comic books, and Disney films.

== History ==
Wade Ceramics was established in 1867 in Burslem, England. It originally comprised several different companies founded by various members of the Wade family and was united as Wade Potteries Limited in 1958. The original companies were:

1. Wade & Myatt (later became George Wade & Son, which made industrial ceramics and Wade Whimsies). Established 1867.
2. John Wade & Co (later Wade Heath & Co, which made decorative ware, particularly Art Deco vases in the 1930s). Established 1867.
3. J & W Wade (later AJ Wade Ltd, which made tiles, notably the original tiles for the London Underground). Established 1891.

In 1905, George Wade & Son took over rival company Henry Hallen. As the Hallen firm was owned by a distant relative and had been founded in 1810, Wade Ceramics (through this) claims to have been established in 1810. In the 1930s, Colonel Sir George Wade gained control of the Wade companies that had previously been run by his father and uncles. He also started further Wade factories, including Wade (Ulster) Ltd in Portadown.

Following the death of Sir George Wade in 1986 at the age of 94, and the loss of his innovative son George Anthony (Tony) Wade to leukaemia in 1987, the Wade potteries were taken over by Beauford Plc in 1998 and renamed Wade Ceramics Ltd. In the early 1990s the Irish pottery factory was renamed Seagoe Ceramics, and was closed down.

Beauford PLC's pottery factories were taken over by a management buyout in 1999, becoming a wholly owned subsidiary of Wade Allied Holdings Ltd. Edward Duke, former CEO of Beauford, became the major shareholder of Wade Allied Holdings and Chairman of Wade Ceramics. His partner Paul Farmer became managing director of Wade. In 2009, Wade Allied Holdings invested £7.9m in a new factory with the latest robotic manufacturing equipment to make ceramic flagons for the whisky industry. The last Wade factory in Burslem was closed in 2010, and sold for housing development. The original factory is still standing and has lain derelict for 10 years, subject to vandalism and arson over the years.

As of 2011, Wade's Ceramics operates from Bessemer Drive in Etruria, Stoke-on-Trent. In November 2022, The company entered into administration citing the difficult UK economic conditions and rising energy prices for its operating difficulties. As of 2 December 2022, Wade Ceramics entered into Administration with the termination of all employees.
