= Lipton Teas and Infusions =

Dutch multinational tea company

Lipton Teas and Infusions B.V.
- Formerly: Ekaterra (2021–2023)
- Type: Private
- Industry: Tea
- Predecessor: Unilever
- Founded: 2021; 5 years ago
- Headquarters: Amsterdam, Netherlands
- Area served: Worldwide
- Key people: Marc Busain (CEO)
- Products: Tea
- Brands: PG Tips; Lipton; Brooke Bond; Pukka; T2; Tazo; Red Rose Tea; Laojee (Sri Lanka only); Salada
- Owner: CVC Capital Partners
- Number of employees: 17,000 (2024)
- Website: liptonteas.com

Lipton Teas and Infusions B.V. is a Dutch multinational company headquartered in Amsterdam, Netherlands that produces tea and other herbal drinks. Founded as a spin-off from Unilever in 2021, it is the largest tea company in the world, owning brands such as Lipton, PG Tips, and TAZO.

Formed in 2020 as a distinct division within Unilever named Ekaterra, in November 2021, Jersey-based private equity firm CVC Capital Partners reached an agreement to purchase the business for €4.5 billion. The sale was completed in 2022, after which Ekaterra was renamed Lipton Teas and Infusions. Unilever retained the use of the brands in India, Nepal, and Indonesia, as well as its ready-to-drink Lipton Iced Tea joint venture with PepsiCo.

== History ==
The Lipton brand is named after its founder, Sir Thomas Lipton, who started a grocery retail business in the United Kingdom in 1871. The Lipton tea business was acquired by consumer goods company Unilever in a number of separate transactions between 1938 and 1972, when Unilever bought the remainder of the global Lipton business from Allied Suppliers.

Founded as a divestment of the majority of Unilever's global tea holdings, Lipton Teas and Infusions became an independent company following the completion of the sale of the majority of Unilever’s tea business to CVC Capital Partners in July 2022.

A month after the sale, the company announced its withdrawal from the Russian market due to the Russian invasion of Ukraine. The situation in the country "does not allow the company to develop its business steadily", said a spokesperson.

The company launched the Lipton Tea Innovation & Technology Academy together with the Government of Kenya and the University of Kabianga in February 2024 to offer training varying from vocational courses to advanced degrees in tea growing and harvesting.

In May 2024, Lipton Teas and Infusions announced an agreement to sell its tea estates in Kenya, Tanzania, and Rwanda to Browns Investments with the proceeds reinvested into East Africa’s tea industry.

== Brands ==
Lipton Teas and Infusions owns over 30 tea brands including:

- Bushells
- Brooke Bond (except for in India, Nepal, and Indonesia)
- Elephant
- Joko
- Laojee
- Lipton (except for in India, Nepal, and Indonesia, or ready-to-drink Lipton Iced Tea)
- Lyons Tea (Ireland)
- Pukka
- PG Tips
- Red Rose Tea (Canada only)
- Salada (Canada only)
- Scottish Blend
- TAZO
- T2
