= Junket (company) =

American dessert business

Junket flavors

Junket is a company that makes rennet tablets and prepackaged powdered dessert mixes and ingredients for making various curdled, milk-based foods, such as junket. It was founded in 1874 by Christian Hansen in Hansen's Laboratorium in Denmark to make rennet extract for the cheesemaking industry. In 1878, Hansen opened up operations in the United States. Herkimer County, New York, was chosen for the headquarters, since it was the center of the US cheese industry at that time.

Rennet tablets, commonly referred to as "Junket tablets", are a source of rennet for home cheesemakers.

The "Junket" brand is now owned and operated by Junket Foods LLC a St. Louis Missouri company with a history with ice cream.

== See also ==
- Junket (dessert)
