= CVC Capital Partners =

British private equity and investment advisory firm

CVC Capital Partners plc

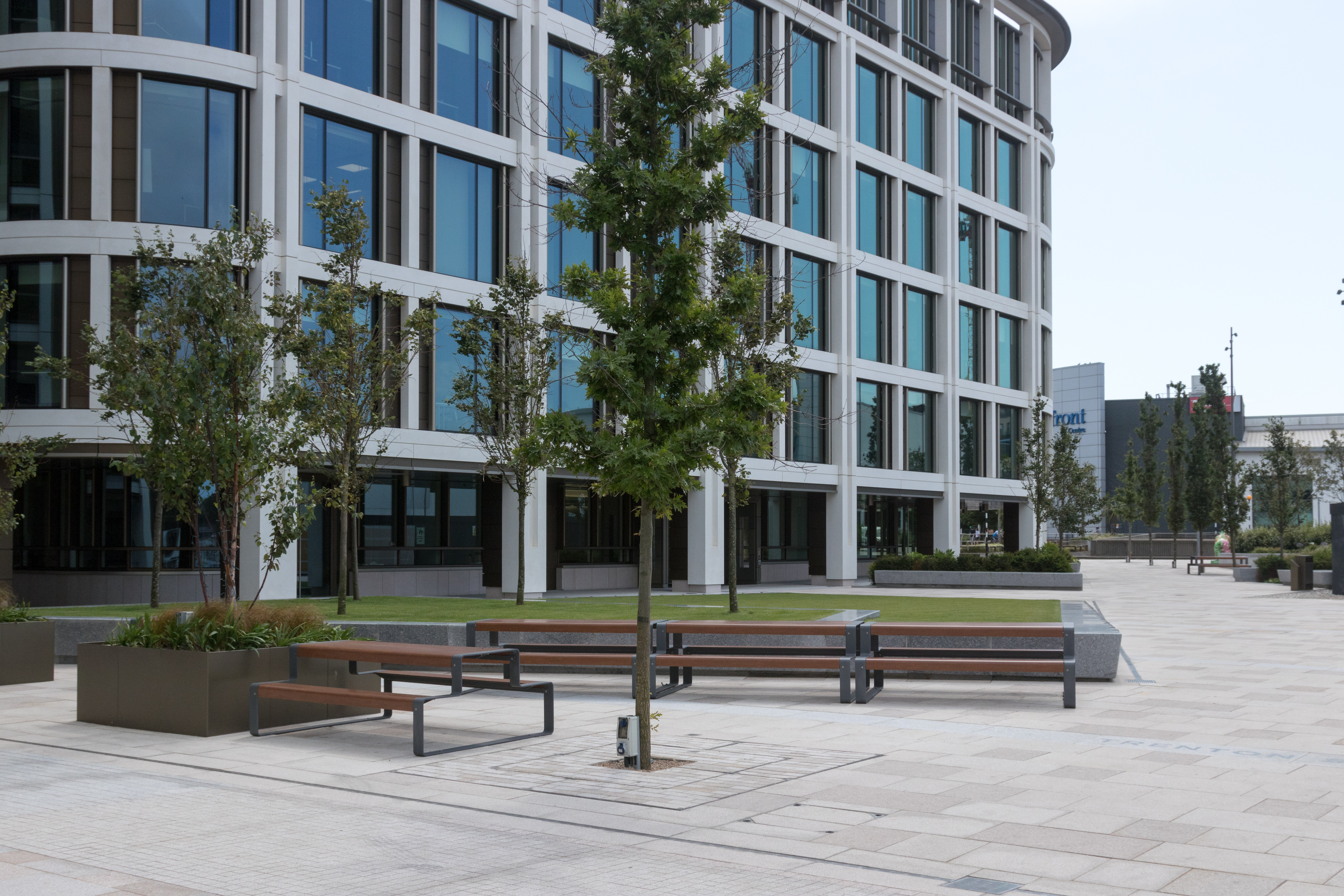
- Headquarters at IFC 5 in St Helier, Jersey
- Type: Public
- Traded as: Euronext Amsterdam: CVC; AEX component
- Industry: Private equity
- Founded: 1981; 45 years ago
- Founder: Rolly van Rappard
- Headquarters: St Helier, Jersey
- Key people: Rob Lucas (Chief Executive and Managing Partner); Rolly van Rappard (co-chair)
- Products: Private equity; Credit; Secondaries; Infrastructure
- Services: Investment Banking & Brokerage; Diversified Financial Services
- Revenue: €1.853 billion (2025)
- AUM: €205 billion (2025)
- Number of employees: 1,507 full-time (2025)
- Website: cvc.com

CVC Capital Partners plc is a Jersey-based private equity and investment advisory firm with approximately €205 billion of assets under management and approximately €157 billion in secured commitments since inception across American, European, and Asian private equity, secondaries, credit funds and infrastructure. As of 31 December 2021, the funds managed or advised by CVC are invested in more than 100 companies worldwide, employing over 450,000 people in numerous countries. CVC was founded in 1981 and, as of 31 March 2022, has over 850 employees working across its network of 25 offices throughout EMEA, Asia and the Americas.

In 2023, it raised the largest ever raised private equity fund globally at €26 billion.

In June 2025, CVC Capital Partners ranked sixth in Private Equity International's PEI 300 ranking among the world's largest private equity firms.

== History ==
=== 20th century ===
Citicorp Venture Capital was founded in 1981. By the early 1990s, Michael Smith, who joined Citicorp in 1982, was leading Citicorp Venture Capital in Europe along with other managing directors Steven Koltes, Hardy McLain, Donald Mackenzie, Iain Parham, and Rolly van Rappard. In 1993, Smith and the senior investment professionals of Citicorp Venture Capital negotiated a spinoff from Citibank to form an independent private equity firm, CVC Capital Partners. In 1996, Rob Lucas, who would go on to be the firm's lead managing partner in the 2020s, joined the firm.

=== 2000s ===
By 2000, CVC was one of the largest and best known private equity firms in Europe. In 2001, CVC completed fundraising for its third investment fund, which was the largest private equity fund raised in Europe at the time, just ahead of funds raised by other leading firms, Apax Partners and BC Partners.

In 2004, CVC and Permira bought from Centrica the British motoring association The AA, and in July 2007 merged The AA with Saga under Acromas Holdings.

In 2006, the US arm of Citigroup Venture Capital also spun out of the bank to form a new firm, known as Court Square Capital Partners. CVC operated offices in London, Paris and Frankfurt. Following the spinoff, CVC raised its first investment fund with $300 million of commitments, half coming from Citicorp and the rest from high-net-worth individuals and institutional investors. Now independent, CVC also completed its transition from venture capital investments to leveraged buyouts and investments in mature businesses. CVC would follow up with its second fund in 1996, it is first fully independent of Citibank, with $840 million of capital commitments.

From November 2005 to March 2006, CVC gradually purchased 63.4% of the shares of the Formula One Group, owner of the Formula One auto racing championship.

In 2006, CVC and Permira were accused by Labour MP Gwyn Prosser in the House of Commons of "greed" and "blatant asset stripping" of The AA "to borrow £500m on the basis of The AA's assets in order to pay themselves a dividend." The AA responded that they were "happy to have a reasoned conversation with Mr Prosser."

In 2007, CVC expanded to the U.S., opening an office in New York City, headed by Christopher Stadler and overseen by Rolly van Rappard.

=== 2010s ===
In 2012, CVC reduced its shares in the Formula One Group to 35.5%. The deputy team principal of Force India, Bob Fernley, accused CVC of "raping the sport" during the period of its involvement in Formula One.

In January 2013, Smith retired from the role of chairman and Koltes, Mackenzie and Van Rappard were appointed co-chairmen of the group.

In January 2015, CVC Capital Partners and Bencis Capital Partners were sentenced to pay fines by the Dutch Authority for Consumers and Markets after it charged the former Dutch portfolio company of the two firms, Meneba Beheer, with breaking competition rules through price fixing. The Dutch regulator ruled that the two firms must pay between €450,000 and €1.5 million after Meneba Beheer, which was itself fined €9 million by the authority, was involved in a collective agreement with competitors to keep prices stable between 2001 and 2007.

In February 2015, CVC made its first investment from CVC Growth Partners in Wireless Logic, Europe's largest machine-to-machine managed service provider, acquiring it from ECI Partners. In March, CVC bought 80% of shares of gambling company Sky Betting & Gaming.

In June 2015, CVC acquired the German perfume retailer Douglas AG for an disclosed fee from private equity firm Advent International. In September, CVC opened an office in Warsaw.

In November 2015, CVC and the Canada Pension Plan Investment Board both acquired American pet supplier Petco for a fee of around $4.6 billion.

In April 2016, CVC Capital Partners acquired German betting operator Tipico. In August, CVC Capital Partners agreed to buy a 15% stake in PT Siloam International Hospitals Tbk, among Indonesia's and Southeast Asia's largest corporate chains of private hospitals.

In September 2016, CVC Capital Partners agreed to sell control of the Formula One Group to John Malone's Liberty Media in a deal worth US$4.4bn. The two-part deal would see the US media group buy 18.7 per cent of the F1 parent company Delta Topco for $746mn in cash from a consortium of shareholders led by CVC. In 2017, a second payment of $354mn in cash and $3.3bn in newly issued shares in a Liberty Media tracking stock saw Liberty Media assume full control of Formula One once the deal was approved by regulators, the FIA and Liberty's shareholders.

In February 2017, CVC Capital Partners acquired Żabka group the leading Polish convenience retailer from Mid Europa Partners for $1.12billion.

In October 2017, CVC Capital Partners acquired Dutch global provider of compliance and administrative services firm TMF Group for €1.75 billion.

In May 2018, CVC Capital Partners paid $160 million for the acquisition of OANDA Global Corporation (OANDA), a global online retail foreign exchange trading platform, currency data and analytics company headquartered in Toronto, Ontario, Canada.

Towards the end of 2019, CVC Capital Partners purchased Ontic from BBA Aviation for $1.365 billion.

=== 2020s ===
In August 2021, Spain's La Liga clubs approved a €2.7 billion deal to sell 10% of the league to CVC Capital Partners. However, Goldman Sachs contributed a €1 billion loan to CVC to complete the deal. In December 2021, as several clubs opted out of the transaction, the final transaction value was approximately €1.994 billion. CVC acquired an 8.2% stake, representing an economic participation in broadcasting and sponsorship revenues for a period of 50 years.

On 25 October 2021, Irelia Company Pte Ltd. (CVC Capital Partners) bought the Ahmedabad-based Indian Premier League cricket franchise (Gujarat Titans) for ₹56,250 million (US$600 million).

In November 2021, CVC acquired the bulk of Unilever's tea division, Lipton Teas and Infusions for £4.5 billion. It included 34 tea brands. The deal also included tea estates in three countries and 11 factories.

In July 2022, CVC sold a near-50 per cent stake in TMF Group to the Abu Dhabi Investment Authority. In 2022, co-founder Steve Koltes stepped down from the firm.

CVC initially planned to float an IPO on the Euronext Amsterdam stock exchange in 2022. The float was delayed, citing market disruption caused by inflation and the invasion of Ukraine. The deal was further postponed in 2023. The chief executive of the firm would be Rob Lucas.

In December 2023, CVC acquired a Japanese pharmacy operator, Sogo Medical, for $1.2 billion.

In February 2024 CVC raised $6.8 billion for its sixth Asia fund, its largest to date in the region and 50% larger than the previous $4.5 billion fund raised in 2020. Donald Mackenzie, another co-founder, stepped back from the firm in February 2024.

In February 2024, CVC completed the creation of CVC Capital Partners Asia VI, the sixth fund in Asia. Asia VI is the very previous fund it created in 2020, a 50% increase from AsiaV, which was raised to $4.5 billion.

On 26 April 2024, CVC listed its shares on the Euronext Amsterdam stock exchange, opening at €17.34. The total offering size was €2.3 billion.

On July 3, 2024, CVC gained a 60% share of DIF Capital Partners with an additional 20% to be acquired shortly after 31 December 2026 and the final 20% to be acquired shortly after 31 December 2028.

On 23 November 2024, Sky News reported that CVC Capital Partners, TF1, RedBird Capital Partners, All3Media, Mediawan and Kohlberg Kravis Roberts had been linked to a potential takeover bid for ITV plc and a possible break-up of core assets such as ITV Studios and ITVX.

In September 2025, CVC Capital Partners acquired a majority stake in Namecheap, a domain registration and web hosting company, in a deal that valued the company at approximately $1.5 billion. The transaction also included Namecheap's subsidiary, Spaceship.

In December 2025, it was announced CVC had agreed to acquire the UK-headquartered company, Smiths Detection from Smith Group for approximately US$2.65 billion. Smiths Detection develops threat-detection and security-screening technologies used in airports and other critical infrastructure. The acquisition will be financed through CVC’s Capital Partners IX fund.

CVC agreed to acquire American credit manager Marathon Asset Management for up to $1.2 billion in January 2026.

CVC and DistroKid made joint announcements on July 6, 2026 that CVC will acquire a majority stake in the indie distribution platform.

== Investment funds ==
Fund	Year	Region	Size (millions)
CVC European Equity Partners I	1996	Europe	$840
CVC European Equity Partners II	1998	Europe	$3,333
CVC Asia Fund I	2000	Asia	$750
CVC European Equity Partners III	2001	Europe	$3,971
CVC European Equity Partners IV	2005	Europe	€6,000
CVC Capital Partners Asia Pacific II	2005	Asia	$1,975
CVC European Equity Partners Tandem Fund	2007	Europe	€4,123
CVC European Equity Partners V	2008	Europe	€10,750
CVC Capital Partners Asia Pacific III	2008	Asia	$4,120
CVC Capital Partners Asia IV	2014	Asia	$3,495
CVC Capital Partners VI	2014	Global	€10,907
CVC Growth Partners	2015	US & Europe	$1,000
CVC Capital Partners VII	2017	Global	$18,000
CVC Strategic Opportunities II	2019	Global	$4,600
CVC Growth Partners II	2019	US & Europe	$1,600
CVC Capital Partners Asia V	2020	Asia	$4,500
CVC Capital Partners VIII	2020	US & Europe	€21,300
CVC Capital Partners Asia VI	2023	Asia	$6,800
CVC Capital Partners IX	2023		€26,000

== Notable investments ==
- Avast: IT security company
- Petco Holdings Inc.: Major pet supplies retail chain
- RAC: Automotive rescue service provider in the UK
- TMF Group: Netherlands-based global provider of compliance and administrative services
- Gujarat Titans: Indian Premier League team
- Namecheap: Domain name registrar and web hosting company
- La Liga: Spanish football league
- Six Nations Rugby: Premier international rugby union tournament
